= 2027 Unrivaled season =

- League: Unrivaled
- Sport: Basketball (three-on-three)
- Duration: January 8 - March 5, 2027
- Teams: 8
- TV partner(s): TNT and TruTV
- Streaming partner: HBO Max

Regular season

Playoffs

Unrivaled seasons
- ← 2026 2028 →

The 2027 season of Unrivaled will be the league's third season. The same eight teams returned for this season, along with the formal player development pool, as well as the creation of the Player Coach Development Program. The eight clubs will play a regular season of matches from January to March to contest for four places in a single-elimination playoff tournament.

This season, Unrivaled will also expand their "tour stops," that they began in the 2026 season. This seasons stops include, Boston, Los Angeles, Detroit, San Francisco, New York, Minneapolis, Houston, and Philadelphia.

== Teams and coaches ==
2026 Unrivaled teams
Team	Head coach
Breeze BC	Jarell Christian
Hive BC	Barb Turner
Laces BC	Andrew Wade
Lunar Owls BC	Pokey Chatman
Mist BC	Zach O'Brien
Phantom BC	Roneeka Hodges
Rose BC	Nola Henry
Vinyl BC	Teresa Weatherspoon

== Rosters/signed players ==
Player (in italic text)	Denotes did not appear in league in the 2026 season

2027 team rosters
Teams	Players						
Teams							Injury replacement
Breeze BC	Monique Billings	Paige Bueckers	DiJonai Carrington	Kaitlyn Chen	Kahleah Copper	Dominique Malonga	
Hive BC	Cameron Brink	Rae Burrell	Sonia Citron	Natisha Hiedeman	Naz Hillmon	Olivia Miles	
Laces BC	Marine Johannès	Satou Sabally	Jessica Shepard	Maddy Siegrist	Gabby Williams	Jackie Young	
Lunar Owls BC	Napheesa Collier	Skylar Diggins	Temi Fagbenle	Marina Mabrey	Sydney Taylor	Courtney Williams	
Mist BC	Veronica Burton	Bridget Carleton	Isabelle Harrison	Arike Ogunbowale	Kiki Rice	Breanna Stewart	
Phantom BC	Natasha Cloud	Aaliyah Edwards	Tiffany Hayes	Kayla McBride	Kelsey Plum	Li Yueru	
Rose BC	Shakira Austin	Chelsea Gray	Lexie Hull	Aziaha James	Brittney Sykes	Kayla Thornton	
Vinyl BC	Jordin Canada	Allisha Gray	Dearica Hamby	Rhyne Howard	Flau'jae Johnson	Aneesah Morrow	

Development pool players:

- Ta'Niya Latson
- Gabriela Jaquez
- Raven Johnson
- Kaila Charles
- Olivia Nelson-Ododa
- Brittney Griner (she will pilot the league’s new Player Coach Development Program)

- Carrington, Collier, Sabally, and McBride had competed in previous seasons of Unrivaled, but not the 2026 season. Carrington, Collier, and Sabally were injured, while McBride played for Fenerbahçe.

== Regular season ==
The regular season began on January 8, 2027.

=== Standings ===
#	Team	W	L	PCT	GB	Rec.
1	Phantom BC					
2	Mist BC					
3	Laces BC					
4	Rose BC					
5	Breeze BC					
6	Vinyl BC					
7	Lunar Owls BC					
8	Hive BC					

Notes:

(#) – League standing
x – Clinched playoff berth
e – Eliminated from playoff contention

=== Schedule ===
2027 Unrivaled regular season
January

Date	Time (ET)	Matchup			Location	TV	Result	High points	High rebounds	High assists
January 8th	7:00 PM	Phantom	vs	Mist	TD Garden	HBO Max				
January 8th	8:30 PM	Vinyl	vs	Breeze	TD Garden	HBO Max				
January 8th	10:00 PM	Rose	vs	Lunar Owls	Intuit Dome	HBO Max				
January 8th	11:30 PM	Hive	vs	Laces	Intuit Dome	HBO Max				
January 11th	7:00 PM	Mist	vs	Breeze	Little Caesars Arena	HBO Max				
January 11th	8:30 PM	Vinyl	vs	Phantom	Little Caesars Arena	HBO Max				
January 11th	10:00 PM	Hive	vs	Rose	Chase Center	HBO Max				
January 11th	11:30 PM	Laces	vs	Lunar Owls	Chase Center	HBO Max				
January 19th	7:30 PM	Vinyl	vs	Mist	Sephora Arena	HBO Max				
January 19th	9:00 PM	Lunar Owls	vs	Hive	Sephora Arena	HBO Max				
January 20th	7:30 PM	Rose	vs	Laces	Sephora Arena	HBO Max				
January 20th	9:00 PM	Breeze	vs	Phantom	Sephora Arena	HBO Max				
January 22nd	7:30 PM	Lunar Owls	vs	Breeze	Barclays Center	HBO Max				
January 22nd	9:00 PM	Hive	vs	Mist	Barclays Center	HBO Max				
January 23rd	8:00 PM	Laces	vs	Vinyl	Sephora Arena	HBO Max				
January 23rd	9:30 PM	Rose	vs	Phantom	Sephora Arena	HBO Max				
January 24th	2:00 PM	Mist	vs	Lunar Owls	Target Center	HBO Max				
January 24th	3:30 PM	Breeze	vs	Hive	Target Center	HBO Max				
January 26th	7:30 PM	Phantom	vs	Laces	Sephora Arena	HBO Max				
January 26th	9:00 PM	Rose	vs	Vinyl	Sephora Arena	HBO Max				
January 29th	7:30 PM	Hive	vs	Vinyl	Sephora Arena	HBO Max				
January 29th	9:00 PM	Lunar Owls	vs	Phantom	Sephora Arena	HBO Max				
January 30th	8:00 PM	Laces	vs	Mist	Sephora Arena	HBO Max				
January 30th	9:30 PM	Breeze	vs	Rose	Sephora Arena	HBO Max				
January 31st	8:00 PM	Phantom	vs	Hive	Sephora Arena	HBO Max				
January 31st	9:30 PM	Vinyl	vs	Lunar Owls	Sephora Arena	HBO Max				

February

Date	Time (ET)	Matchup			Location	TV	Result	High points	High rebounds	High assists
February 1st	7:30 PM	Laces	vs	Breeze	Sephora Arena	HBO Max				
February 1st	9:00 PM	Rose	vs	Mist	Sephora Arena	HBO Max				
February 5th	7:30 PM	Laces	vs	Hive	Sephora Arena	HBO Max				
February 5th	9:00 PM	Breeze	vs	Lunar Owls	Sephora Arena	HBO Max				
February 6th	8:00 PM	Mist	vs	Vinyl	Sephora Arena	HBO Max				
February 6th	9:30 PM	Phantom	vs	Rose	Sephora Arena	HBO Max				
February 7th	8:00 PM	Hive	vs	Breeze	Sephora Arena	HBO Max				
February 7th	9:30 PM	Lunar Owls	vs	Laces	Sephora Arena	HBO Max				
February 8th	7:30 PM	Mist	vs	Phantom	Sephora Arena	HBO Max				
February 8th	9:00 PM	Vinyl	vs	Rose	Sephora Arena	HBO Max				
February 12th	7:30 PM	Phantom	vs	Breeze	Toyota Center	HBO Max				
February 12th	9:00 PM	Vinyl	vs	Laces	Toyota Center	HBO Max				
February 13th	8:00 PM	Rose	vs	Hive	Sephora Arena	HBO Max				
February 13th	9:30 PM	Lunar Owls	vs	Mist	Sephora Arena	HBO Max				
February 15th	7:30 PM	Phantom	vs	Vinyl	Xfinity Mobile Arena	HBO Max				
February 15th	9:30 PM	Breeze	vs	Lacse	Xfinity Mobile Arena	HBO Max				
February 23rd	8:00 PM	Lunar Owls	vs	Rose	Sephora Arena	HBO Max				
February 23rd	9:30 PM	Mist	vs	Hive	Sephora Arena	HBO Max				
February 26th	7:30 PM	Phantom	vs	Lunar Owls	Sephora Arena	HBO Max				
February 26th	9:00 PM	Vinyl	vs	Hive	Sephora Arena	HBO Max				
February 27th	5:00 PM	Laces	vs	Rose	Sephora Arena	HBO Max				
February 27th	6:30 PM	Breeze	vs	Mist	Sephora Arena	HBO Max				
February 28th	8:00 PM	Lunar Owls	vs	Vinyl	Sephora Arena	HBO Max				
February 28th	9:30 PM	Hive	vs	Phantom	Sephora Arena	HBO Max				

March

Date	Time (ET)	Matchup			Location	TV	Result	High points	High rebounds	High assists
March 1st	7:30 PM	Rose	vs	Breeze	Sephora Arena	HBO Max				
March 1st	9:00 PM	Mist	vs	Laces	Sephora Arena	HBO Max				
March 5th	1:00 PM	TBD	vs	TBD	Sephora Arena	HBO Max				
March 5th	2:30 PM	TBD	vs	TBD	Sephora Arena	HBO Max				
March 5th	7:30 PM	TBD	vs	TBD	Sephora Arena	HBO Max				
March 5th	9:00 PM	TBD	vs	TBD	Sephora Arena	HBO Max				

== Season Awards ==
=== Postseason awards ===
Award	Winner	Position	Team	Votes/statistic	Ref.
Most Valuable Player					
Finals MVP					
Defensive Player of the Year					
Leading Scorer					
Opill Total Rebound Leader					
State Farm Season Assist Leader					
Coach of the Year					

Team	Members	Ref.
All-Unrivaled First Team		
All-Unrivaled Second Team		
