= 2026 Unrivaled season =

- League: Unrivaled
- Sport: Basketball (three-on-three)
- Duration: January 5 – March 4, 2026
- Teams: 8
- TV partner(s): TNT and TruTV
- Streaming partner: HBO Max

Regular season
- Season MVP: Chelsea Gray (Rose)

Playoffs
- Finals champions: Mist BC
- Runners-up: Phantom BC
- Finals MVP: Breanna Stewart (Mist)

Unrivaled seasons
- ← 2025 2027 →

The 2026 season of Unrivaled was the league's second season. The inaugural six clubs returned for the 2026 season with the addition of two new clubs, Breeze BC and Hive BC, and a formal player development pool. The eight clubs played a regular season of matches from January to March to contest for four places in a single-elimination playoff tournament.

== Teams and coaches ==
2026 Unrivaled teams
Team	Head coach
Breeze BC	Noelle Quinn
Hive BC	Rena Wakama
Laces BC	Andrew Wade
Lunar Owls BC	DJ Sackmann
Mist BC	Zach O'Brien
Phantom BC	Roneeka Hodges
Rose BC	Nola Henry
Vinyl BC	Teresa Weatherspoon

== Rosters/signed players ==
(**c**)	Denotes captain of basketball club
**Player** (in bold text)	Denotes wildcard selection
Player (in italic text)	Denotes did not appear in league in the 2026 season

2026 team rosters
Teams	Players						
Teams							Injury replacement
Breeze BC	Cameron Brink	Paige Bueckers (**c**)	Kate Martin	Aari McDonald	Dominique Malonga	Rickea Jackson	
Hive BC	Saniya Rivers	Kelsey Mitchell	Sonia Citron (**c**)	Monique Billings	Ezi Magbegor	Natisha Hiedeman	
Laces BC	Jackie Young (**c**)	Brittney Sykes	Jordin Canada	Maddy Siegrist	Alyssa Thomas	Naz Hillmon	
Lunar Owls BC	Skylar Diggins	Marina Mabrey	Rachel Banham	Rebecca Allen	Napheesa Collier (**c**)	Aaliyah Edwards	Temi Fagbenle
Mist BC	Allisha Gray	Alanna Smith	Veronica Burton	Arike Ogunbowale	Breanna Stewart (**c**)	Li Yueru	
Phantom BC	Kelsey Plum (**c**)	Natasha Cloud	Aliyah Boston	Dana Evans	Satou Sabally	Kiki Iriafen	Tiffany Hayes
Rose BC	Chelsea Gray	Kahleah Copper (**c**)	Sug Sutton	Lexie Hull	Shakira Austin	Azurá Stevens	
Vinyl BC	Courtney Williams	Erica Wheeler	Rhyne Howard	Rae Burrell	Brittney Griner	Dearica Hamby (**c**)	

Development pool players:

- Hailey Van Lith
- Aziaha James
- Haley Jones
- Emily Engstler
- Laeticia Amihere
- Makayla Timpson
- Kiana Williams

Listed in order of announcement

- Alyssa Thomas
- Rickea Jackson
- Satou Sabally
- Paige Bueckers
- Saniya Rivers
- Erica Wheeler
- Breanna Stewart
- Lexie Hull
- Azurá Stevens
- Jackie Young
- Sonia Citron
- Veronica Burton
- Kate Martin
- Dearica Hamby
- Natasha Cloud
- Aaliyah Edwards
- Kiki Iriafen
- Monique Billings
- Napheesa Collier
- Rae Burrell
- Chelsea Gray
- Brittney Sykes
- Kelsey Mitchell
- Naz Hillmon
- Kahleah Copper
- Allisha Gray
- Shakira Austin
- Courtney Williams
- Sug Sutton
- Natisha Hiedeman
- Skylar Diggins
- Brittney Griner
- Rhyne Howard
- Aliyah Boston
- Ezi Magbegor
- Rachel Banham
- Cameron Brink
- Arike Ogunbowale
- Marina Mabrey
- Maddy Siegrist
- Alanna Smith
- Jordin Canada
- Li Yueru
- Kelsey Plum
- Dana Evans
- Aari McDonald
- Rebecca Allen
- Dominique Malonga

== Regular season ==
The regular season began on January 5, 2026.

=== Standings ===
#	Team	W	L	PCT	GB	Rec.
1	x– Phantom BC	11	3	.786	–	11-3
2	x – Mist BC	10	4	.714	1	10-4
3	x – Laces BC	10	4	.714	1	10-4
4	x – Rose BC	6	8	.429	5	6-8
5	x - Breeze BC	6	8	.429	5	6-8
6	x – Vinyl BC	5	9	.357	6	5-9
7	e – Lunar Owls BC	4	10	.286	7	4-10
8	e - Hive BC	4	10	.286	7	4-10

Notes:

(#) – League standing
x – Clinched playoff berth
e – Eliminated from playoff contention

== Season Awards ==
=== Postseason awards ===
Award	Winner	Position	Team	Votes/statistic	Ref.
Most Valuable Player	Chelsea Gray	Guard	Rose BC	Not released	
Finals MVP	Breanna Stewart	Forward	Mist BC	Not released	
Defensive Player of the Year	Aliyah Boston	Forward	Phantom BC	Not released	
Leading Scorer	Marina Mabrey	Forward	Lunar Owls BC	25.3 ppg	
Opill Total Rebound Leader	Aaliyah Edwards	Forward	Lunar Owls BC	169 rebounds	
State Farm Season Assist Leader	Chelsea Gray	Guard	Rose BC	76 assists	
Coach of the Year	Roneeka Hodges	Head coach	Phantom BC	Not released	

Team	Members			Ref.
All-Unrivaled First Team	Chelsea Gray	Kelsey Plum	Paige Bueckers	
All-Unrivaled Second Team	Brittany Sykes	Aliyah Boston	Allisha Gray	
