= 2025 Unrivaled season =

- League: Unrivaled
- Sport: Basketball (three-on-three)
- Duration: January 17 – March 17, 2025
- Games: 48
- Teams: 6
- TV partner(s): TNT and TruTV
- Streaming partner: Max

Regular season
- Season MVP: Napheesa Collier (Lunar Owls)

Playoffs
- Finals champions: Rose BC
- Runners-up: Vinyl BC
- Finals MVP: Chelsea Gray (Rose)

Unrivaled seasons
- 2026 →

The 2025 season of Unrivaled was the league's inaugural season. Six teams played a regular season of matches from January to March, to contest four places in a single-elimination playoff tournament that determined the champions of the league.

Location of the primary venue for the league's matches in Medley, Florida

== Teams and coaches ==
In October 2024, the inaugural six team names were announced. For the 2025 season, teams did not have designated geographic connections, although the branding was created with a consideration for potential future sale and relocation of the teams.

In November 2024, the 2025 head coaches were announced: Phil Handy, Adam Harrington, Nola Henry, DJ Sackmann, Teresa Weatherspoon, and Andrew Wade. On November 20, after the team selection, the head coaches were each assigned to a team.

2025 Unrivaled teams
Team	Head coach
Laces BC	Andrew Wade
Lunar Owls BC	DJ Sackmann
Mist BC	Phil Handy
Phantom BC	Adam Harrington
Rose BC	Nola Henry
Vinyl BC	Teresa Weatherspoon

== Rosters ==
For the inaugural season, Unrivaled was originally announced to consist of 30 professional players with six five-player teams. Starting in July 2024, the players for the 2025 season began to be announced one-by-one on Unrivaled's social media accounts. Hints were given on social media before roster announcements, encouraging fans to engage and make their guesses on the next roster addition. In late October 2024, the league announced it had "surpassed its initial financial targets" and would be expanding the inaugural season roster to 36 total players and increase the individual team roster size to six players.

On November 20, 2024, players were divvied into their Unrivaled teams with the event being streamed on the league's YouTube channel. During the selection process, players were assigned to six pods (six players in each pod). The head coaches then assigned one player from each pod to create balanced rosters for each club. Once all rosters were set, the head coaches were then made aware of which team they would be coaching for the 2025 season. At the time of the selection show, only 34 players had been confirmed to be participating in the 2025 season. The final two players were drafted as wildcards within Pod D and went to Lunar Owls BC and Phantom BC. Teams with a wildcard selection were able to recruit and sign player of their choosing.

In late November 2024, Kelsey Plum announced via social media that she would no longer be playing in the 2025 season and instead would "take some more time for myself this offseason," leaving Laces BC with a wildcard spot. On December 17, 2024, Cameron Brink signed a multiyear deal with the Lunar Owls; however, Brink did not appear in the league until the 2026 season due to injury. And on December 20, 2024, it was announced that Katie Lou Samuelson had signed with Phantom BC. On December 21, 2024, the league's first trades were announced: Laces BC traded Courtney Williams to Lunar Owls BC for Natasha Cloud. Laces BC then traded Cloud and their wildcard pick to Phantom BC in exchange for Jackie Young and Tiffany Hayes. The final wildcard spot, belonging to Phantom BC, was filled by Sabrina Ionescu on December 23, 2024, in a signing deal that "puts her in a category of her own" in the Unrivaled league.

(**c**)	Denotes captain of basketball club
**Player** (in bold text)	Denotes wildcard selection
Player (in italic text)	Denotes did not appear in league in the 2025 season

2025 team rosters
Teams	Players					
Teams	Pod A	Pod B	Pod C	Pod D	Pod E	Pod F
Laces BC	Jackie Young	Tiffany Hayes	Kayla McBride	Kate Martin	Alyssa Thomas (**c**)	Stefanie Dolson
Lunar Owls BC	Skylar Diggins-Smith	Courtney Williams	Allisha Gray	Cameron Brink	Napheesa Collier (**c**)	Shakira Austin
Mist BC	Jewell Loyd	Courtney Vandersloot	DiJonai Carrington	Rickea Jackson	Breanna Stewart (**c**)	Aaliyah Edwards
Phantom BC	**Sabrina Ionescu**	Natasha Cloud	Marina Mabrey	**Katie Lou Samuelson**	Satou Sabally (**c**)	Brittney Griner
Rose BC	Chelsea Gray (**c**)	Brittney Sykes	Kahleah Copper	Lexie Hull	Angel Reese	Azurá Stevens
Vinyl BC	Arike Ogunbowale (**c**)	Jordin Canada	Rhyne Howard	Rae Burrell	Aliyah Boston	Dearica Hamby

=== Relief players ===
- Natisha Hiedeman: Phantom BC (January 17–27; March 3–8); Laces BC (January 27–March 3); Rose BC (March 16–17)
- NaLyssa Smith: Mist BC (January 24–March 10)
- Kiki Jefferson: Laces BC (February 8–20; March 3–8); Rose BC (February 21–March 1); Lunar Owls BC (March 16)
- Betnijah Laney-Hamilton: Laces BC (February 18–March 3)
- Ariel Atkins: Rose BC (February 24–March 10); Laces BC (March 16)
- Naz Hillmon: Rose BC (March 16–17)

== Pre-season ==
Players reported to training camp on January 2, 2025.

== Regular season ==
The regular season began on January 17, 2025, with seven weeks of round-robin play. For the 2025 season, all regular season games were played in a custom facility (Wayfair Arena) at Mediapro Studios in the Miami suburb of Medley, Florida. Regular season games occurred three nights a week with two games played each night.

=== Standings ===
#	Team	W	L	PCT	GB	Rec.
1	x – Lunar Owls BC	13	1	.929	–	13–1
2	x – Rose BC	8	6	.571	5	8–6
3	x – Laces BC	7	7	.500	6	7–7
4	x – Vinyl BC	5	9	.357	8	5–9
5	e – Mist BC	5	9	.357	8	5–9
6	e – Phantom BC	4	10	.286	9	4–10

Notes:

(#) – League standing
x – Clinched playoff berth
e – Eliminated from playoff contention

=== 1 on 1 tournament ===
A one-on-one single-elimination tournament took place mid-season, February 10–14, 2025, with the winner earning $200,000. (Note: Ahead of the 2025 season, the league had originally reported the winner of the tournament would receive $250,000.) In January 2025, Sprite was named the presenting partner of the 2025 1-on-1 tournament. The runner-up of the tournament earned $50,000 and the remaining two semi-finalists earned $25,000 each. Additionally, clubmates of the winner earned $10,000 each.

All games for the one-on-one tournament were played with a continuous clock to a winning score of 11 points or to 10 minutes in length, whichever occurred first. The shot clock was set at seven seconds with players earning next possession after each made shot (also known as make it, take it or winner's ball).

From January 30 to February 2, 2025, fans were able to vote for any of the 30 players to determine their seedings within pods for the first round. The first round began on February 10 and consisted of fourteen single-elimination 1-on-1 games across two televised sessions, with the top seeds in Pods A and D getting byes in the first round. Eight second round games followed by the 4 quarterfinal games aired on February 11 on truTV. The final four remaining players appeared in the semifinals on February 14 and was followed immediately after with a best of three games for the final. Notable exclusions from the player pool include Stefanie Dolson, Brittney Griner, Sabrina Ionescu, Angel Reese, and Courtney Vandersloot, as well as the league's 2025 relief players.

On February 9, the league announced that Natasha Cloud, Tiffany Hayes, Marina Mabrey, Kate Martin, Kayla McBride, Alyssa Thomas, and Brittney Sykes had withdrawn from the 2025 1 on 1 tournament due to injury, resulting in multiple walkovers in the bracket.

==== Finals bracket ====
Quarterfinals: Single elimination
A-4	Rae Burrell	2
A-6	Azurá Stevens	12
B-1	Napheesa Collier	12
B-6	Courtney Williams	4
C-8	Aaliyah Edwards	12
C-3	Allisha Gray	6
D-1	Arike Ogunbowale	12
D-3	Satou Sabally	8

Semifinals: Single elimination
A-6	Azurá Stevens	2
B-1	Napheesa Collier	11
C-8	Aaliyah Edwards	11
D-1	Arike Ogunbowale	2

Final: Best-of-3
B-1	Napheesa Collier	6	9	8
C-8	Aaliyah Edwards	9	4	0

=== Schedule ===
All games were played at the Wayfair Arena.

2025 Unrivaled regular season
January

Date	Time (ET)	Matchup			TV	Result	High points	High rebounds	High assists	U.S. viewers
Friday, January 17	7:00 p.m.	Mist BC	vs	Lunar Owls BC	TNT	80–84	Jewell Loyd (34)	Breanna Stewart (14)	Courtney Williams (4)	290k
Friday, January 17	8:15 p.m.	Rose BC	vs	Vinyl BC	TNT	73–79	Rhyne Howard (33)	Angel Reese (14)	Chelsea Gray (6)	284k
Saturday, January 18	2:00 p.m.	Phantom BC	vs	Laces BC	truTV	48–86	Kayla McBride (28)	Kate Martin (10)	Tiffany Hayes (10)	113k
Saturday, January 18	3:00 p.m.	Lunar Owls BC	vs	Rose BC	truTV	79–70	Napheesa Collier (31)	Allisha Gray (9)	Courtney Williams (8)	89k
Monday, January 20	8:30 p.m.	Vinyl BC	vs	Phantom BC	TNT	84–71	Dearica Hamby (22)	Rhyne Howard (8)	Sabrina Ionescu (6)	187k
Monday, January 20	9:30 p.m.	Laces BC	vs	Mist BC	TNT	63–43	Kayla McBride (21)	Alyssa Thomas (15)	Alyssa Thomas (4)	120k
Friday, January 24	7:15 p.m.	Phantom BC	vs	Mist BC	TNT	74–69	Griner & Sabally (29)	Breanna Stewart (11)	Natasha Cloud (9)	261k
Friday, January 24	8:15 p.m.	Laces BC	vs	Vinyl BC	TNT	83–79	Tiffany Hayes (26)	Alyssa Thomas (12)	Tied – 4 players (4)	265k
Saturday, January 25	6:00 p.m.	Mist BC	vs	Rose BC	truTV	66–71	Breanna Stewart (20)	Breanna Stewart (9)	Jewell Loyd (7)	N/A
Saturday, January 25	7:00 p.m.	Lunar Owls BC	vs	Phantom BC	truTV	82–58	Napheesa Collier (37)	Napheesa Collier (18)	Natasha Cloud (6)	118k
Monday, January 27	7:30 p.m.	Vinyl BC	vs	Lunar Owls BC	TNT	57–67	Collier & A. Gray (19)	Napheesa Collier (17)	Arike Ogunbowale (7)	119k
Monday, January 27	8:30 p.m.	Rose BC	vs	Laces BC	TNT	64–71	Kayla McBride (31)	Tiffany Hayes (11)	Chelsea Gray (5)	163k
Friday, January 31	7:15 p.m.	Phantom BC	vs	Rose BC	TNT	75–63	Sabrina Ionescu (32)	Ionescu & Copper (9)	Sabrina Ionescu (8)	139k
Friday, January 31	8:15 p.m.	Laces BC	vs	Lunar Owls BC	TNT	73–75	Collier & McBride (26)	Kayla McBride (8)	Hayes & Williams (5)	187k

February

Date	Time (ET)	Matchup			TV	Result	High points	High rebounds	High assists	U.S. viewers
Saturday, February 1	6:00 p.m.	Mist BC	vs	Vinyl BC	truTV	77–67	Dearica Hamby (35)	Dearica Hamby (15)	Courtney Vandersloot (9)	N/A
Saturday, February 1	7:00 p.m.	Rose BC	vs	Laces BC	truTV	83–69	Chelsea Gray (28)	Angel Reese (15)	Chelsea Gray (8)	130k
Monday, February 3	7:30 p.m.	Mist BC	vs	Phantom BC	TNT	64–61	Satou Sabally (22)	Breanna Stewart (13)	Sabrina Ionescu (9)	145k
Monday, February 3	8:30 p.m.	Lunar Owls BC	vs	Vinyl BC	TNT	85–68	Napheesa Collier (36)	Napheesa Collier (12)	Skylar Diggins-Smith (6)	191k
Friday, February 7	7:15 p.m.	Phantom BC	vs	Lunar Owls BC	TNT	76–94	A. Gray & Griner (23)	Satou Sabally (7)	Natasha Cloud (8)	163k
Friday, February 7	8:15 p.m.	Mist BC	vs	Rose BC	TNT	63–71	Kahleah Copper (21)	Angel Reese (12)	Chelsea Gray (7)	157k
Saturday, February 8	—	Vinyl BC	vs	Laces BC	–	11–0	Game canceled – Laces forfeit			
Saturday, February 8	6:00 p.m.	Lunar Owls BC	vs	Mist BC	truTV	85–81	Napheesa Collier (38)	Breanna Stewart (17)	Allisha Gray (6)	N/A
Monday, February 10	7:00 p.m.	1 on 1 Tournament: 1st Round			TNT and truTV	—				213k
Tuesday, February 11	7:00 p.m.	1 on 1 Tournament: 2nd Round + Quarterfinals			truTV	—				189k
Friday, February 14	7:30 p.m.	1 on 1 Tournament: Semifinals + Finals			TNT and truTV	—				377k
Tuesday, February 18	7:30 p.m.	Vinyl BC	vs	Rose BC	TNT	55–61	Chelsea Gray (26)	Angel Reese (15)	Tied – 3 players (3)	172k
Tuesday, February 18	8:30 p.m.	Laces BC	vs	Phantom BC	TNT	75–68	Kayla McBride (30)	Sabrina Ionescu (13)	Natasha Cloud (8)	205k
Friday, February 21	7:15 p.m.	Rose BC	vs	Lunar Owls BC	TNT	72–63	Chelsea Gray (26)	Angel Reese (21)	Diggins-Smith & C. Gray (5)	176k
Friday, February 21	8:15 p.m.	Vinyl BC	vs	Mist BC	TNT	72–65	Rhyne Howard (26)	Breanna Stewart (13)	Canada & Loyd (5)	174k
Saturday, February 22	6:00 p.m.	Lunar Owls BC	vs	Laces BC	truTV	88-60	Allisha Gray (26)	Courtney Williams (10)	Courtney Williams (7)	N/A
Saturday, February 22	7:00 p.m.	Phantom BC	vs	Vinyl BC	truTV	79-72	Rhyne Howard (28)	Jordin Canada (10)	Jordin Canada (8)	143k
Monday, February 24	7:30 p.m.	Rose BC	vs	Phantom BC	TNT	71-59	Chelsea Gray (26)	Angel Reese (14)	Chelsea Gray (7)	153k
Monday, February 24	8:30 p.m.	Mist BC	vs	Laces BC	TNT	65-49	Breanna Stewart (21)	Breanna Stewart (12)	Stewart & Vandersloot (4)	179k
Friday, February 28	7:15 p.m.	Laces BC	vs	Vinyl BC	TNT	63-64	Rhyne Howard (24)	Aliyah Boston (10)	Jordin Canada (6)	149k
Friday, February 28	8:15 p.m.	Phantom BC	vs	Mist BC	TNT	62-88	Brittney Griner (24)	Stewart & Ionescu (8)	Breanna Stewart (9)	190k

March

Date	Time (ET)	Matchup			TV	Result	High points	High rebounds	High assists	U.S. viewers
Saturday, March 1	6:00 p.m.	Vinyl BC	vs	Lunar Owls BC	truTV	72-78	Dearica Hamby (31)	Dearica Hamby (11)	Jordin Canada (8)	N/A
Saturday, March 1	7:00 p.m.	Rose BC	vs	Mist BC	truTV	62-71	Chelsea Gray (38)	Angel Reese (13)	Breanna Stewart (5)	148k
Monday, March 3	7:30 p.m.	Laces BC	vs	Rose BC	TNT	53-58	Chelsea Gray (26)	Angel Reese (17)	Alyssa Thomas (8)	136k
Monday, March 3	8:30 p.m.	Lunar Owls BC	vs	Phantom BC	TNT	92-79	Napheesa Collier (33)	Napheesa Collier (12)	Skylar Diggins-Smith (11)	149k
Friday, March 7	7:15 p.m.	Phantom BC	vs	Laces BC	TNT	59-73	Kayla McBride (25)	Alyssa Thomas (12)	Kayla McBride (5)	111k
Friday, March 7	8:15 p.m.	Lunar Owls BC	vs	Rose BC	TNT	66-56	Tied - 3 players (17)	Angel Reese (10)	Chelsea Gray (5)	161k
Saturday, March 8	6:00 p.m.	Laces BC	vs	Mist BC	truTV	76-69	Jackie Young (27)	Breanna Stewart (13)	Alyssa Thomas (6)	N/A
Saturday, March 8	7:00 p.m.	Vinyl BC	vs	Phantom BC	truTV	74-80	Rhyne Howard (37)	Rhyne Howard (12)	Rhyne Howard (5)	N/A
Monday, March 10	7:30 p.m.	Mist BC	vs	Lunar Owls BC	TNT	58-92	Napheesa Collier (29)	Breanna Stewart (10)	Courtney Williams (6)	134k
Monday, March 10	8:30 p.m.	Rose BC	vs	Vinyl BC	TNT	74-46	Chelsea Gray (33)	Hamby & Reese (13)	Brittney Sykes (5)	197k

== Playoffs and finals ==
At the conclusion of the regular season, the top four teams (Lunar Owls BC, Rose BC, Laces BC, and Vinyl BC) entered the playoffs to compete for the championship title in single-elimination games. The postseason concluded on March 17, 2025.

The first Unrivaled League Championship was won by Rose BC against Vinyl BC (62-54), with Chelsea Gray named as Finals MVP.

=== Bracket ===
Semifinals
1	Lunar Owls BC	70
4	Vinyl BC	73
2	Rose BC	63
3	Laces BC	57

Final
4	Vinyl BC	54
2	Rose BC	62

=== Schedule ===
2025 Unrivaled playoffs
Semifinals

Date	Time (ET)	Matchup			TV	Result	High points	High rebounds	High assists	U.S. viewers
Sunday, March 16	7:30 p.m.	Laces BC	vs	Rose BC	truTV & TNT	57–63	Chelsea Gray (39)	Azurá Stevens (11)	Gray & Hayes (4)	226k
Sunday, March 16	8:30 p.m.	Vinyl BC	vs	Lunar Owls BC	truTV & TNT	73–70	Napheesa Collier (36)	Dearica Hamby (15)	Skylar Diggins-Smith (8)	226k

Finals

Date	Time (ET)	Matchup			TV	Result	High points	High rebounds	High assists	U.S. viewers
Monday, March 17	7:30 p.m.	Vinyl BC	vs	Rose BC	truTV & TNT	54-62	Rhyne Howard (22)	Azurá Stevens (18)	Chelsea Gray (8)	262k

== Season award winners ==
=== IcyHot Comeback of the Week ===
Week	Award Winner	Note	Ref.
January 24	Lunar Owls BC	21–7 run in third quarter in Unrivaled's inaugural game vs. the Mist	
January 29	Phantom BC	12 point comeback over the Mist to win their first game of the season	
February 6	Lunar Owls BC	12 point comeback over the Laces	
February 15	Aaliyah Edwards	Performance in the 1-on-1 Tournament	
February 20	Kayla McBride	Returned from injury and dropped 30 points against the Phantom	
March 6	Mist BC	10 point comeback over the Rose, putting them within playoff contention	
March 13	Jackie Young	Returned from injury and led the Laces to the playoffs with a combined 45 points and 10 rebounds in two games	

=== Postseason awards ===
Award	Winner	Position	Team	Votes/Statistic	Ref.
Most Valuable Player	Napheesa Collier	Forward	Lunar Owls BC	Not released	
Finals MVP	Chelsea Gray	Guard	Rose BC	Not released	
Defensive Player of the Year	Angel Reese	Forward	Rose BC	Not released	
Leading Scorer	Napheesa Collier	Forward	Lunar Owls BC	25.7 ppg	
Opill Total Rebound Leader	Angel Reese	Forward	Rose BC	169 rebounds	
State Farm Season Assist Leader	Chelsea Gray	Guard	Rose BC	76 assists	
Coach of the Year	DJ Sackmann	Head coach	Lunar Owls BC	Not released	

Team	Members			Ref.
All-Unrivaled First Team	Chelsea Gray	Kayla McBride	Napheesa Collier	
All-Unrivaled Second Team	Angel Reese	Rhyne Howard	Skylar Diggins-Smith	

== Broadcasting ==
TNT Sports air Monday and Friday games on TNT and truTV, with Saturday games airing exclusively on truTV. All games are additionally streamed on Max.
