= Rae Burrell =

American basketball player (born 2000)

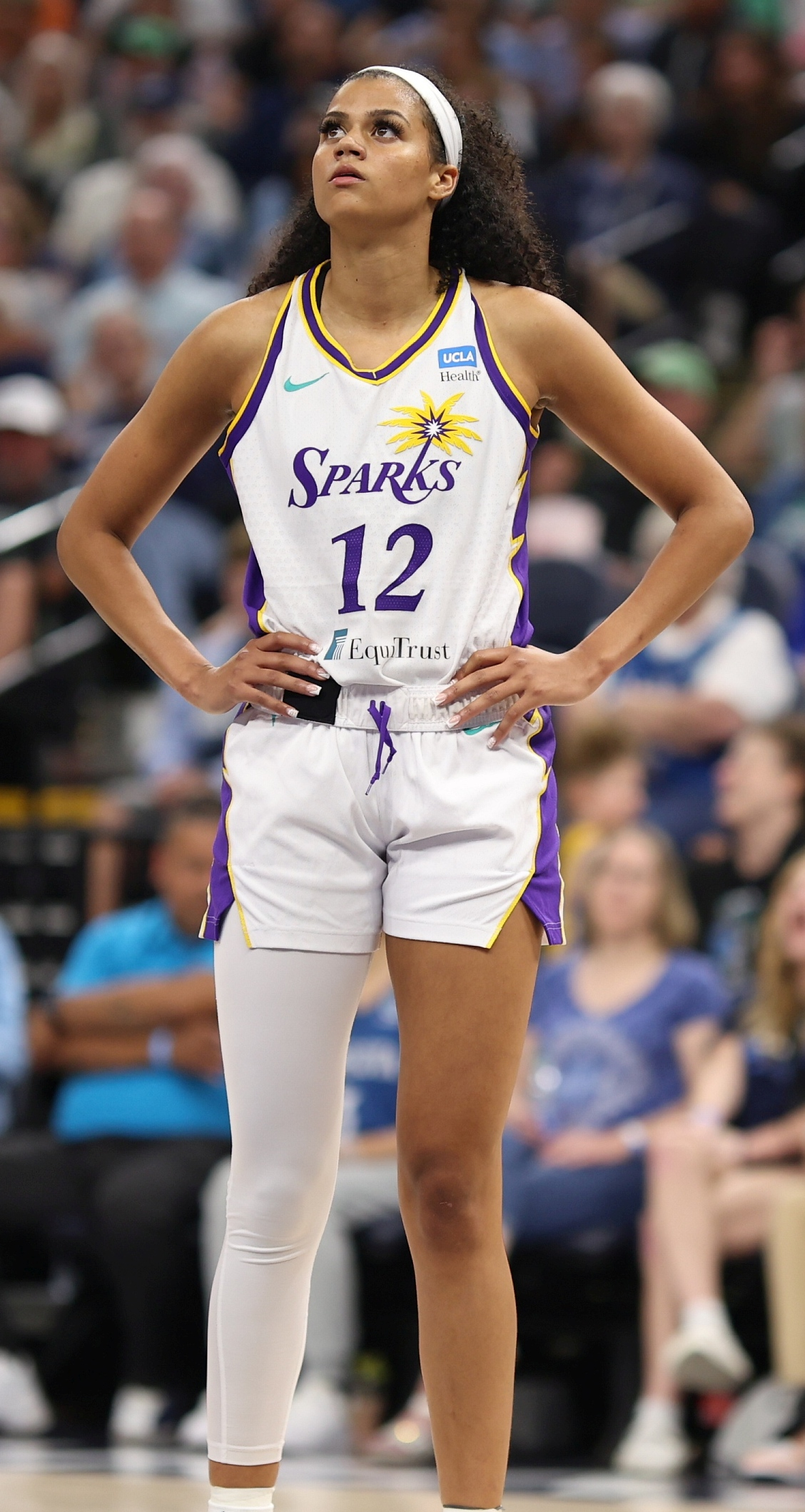
- Burrell with the Los Angeles Sparks in 2023

No. 12 – Los Angeles Sparks
- Position: Shooting guard / small forward
- League: WNBA

Personal information
- Born: June 21, 2000 (age 26) Las Vegas, Nevada, U.S.
- Listed height: 6 ft 2 in (1.88 m)
- Listed weight: 168 lb (76 kg)

Career information
- High school: Liberty (Henderson, Nevada)
- College: Tennessee (2018–2022)
- WNBA draft: 2022: 1st round, 9th overall pick
- Drafted by: Los Angeles Sparks

Career history
- 2022–present: Los Angeles Sparks
- 2022–2023: UC Capitals
- 2023: Kangoeroes Basket Mechelen
- 2025–2026: Vinyl
- 2027–present: Hive

Career highlights
- SEC All-Second Team (2021); SEC Academic Honor Roll (2020)
- Stats at Basketball Reference

Rae Burrell (born June 21, 2000) is an American professional basketball player for the Los Angeles Sparks of the Women's National Basketball Association (WNBA) and for the Hive of Unrivaled. She played college basketball for the Tennessee Volunteers after attending Liberty High School in Henderson, Nevada, where she was named the Las Vegas Review-Journal Best of Nevada Preps Female Athlete of the Year in 2018.

== College career ==
Burrell was ranked the 43rd overall recruit by ESPN's HoopGurlz and committed to play for the Tennessee Volunteers. In her freshman season, she played in every game - averaging 12.7 minutes. She scored a season high of 14 points, twice, against Presbyterian and Florida A&M.

During her sophomore campaign, Burrell became the team's top reserve. She finished the year averaging 10.5 points and 5.5 rebounds. She also recorded the first double-double of her career against Mississippi State with 20 points, 10 rebounds, three steals, and one block.

As a junior, Burrell averaged 16.8 points and 4.6 rebounds per game. She also was the only Volunteer to start all the games. She played well in the NCAA Tournament, scoring 22 points against Middle Tennessee in their opening game.

Before her senior season, Burrell was ranked the 24th best women's college basketball player entering the 2021–2022 season. In an early game against Southern Illinois, she went down with a knee injury that caused her to miss several weeks. After returning from injury, Burrell played in 22 games, averaging 12.3 points and 3.9 rebounds. She turned up her play late in the year after fellow guard Jordan Horston went down with an injury. She led the Volunteers back to the Sweet Sixteen - before falling to the Louisville Cardinals. She scored 22 points to end her Tennessee career.

On March 29, Burrell announced on Instagram that she would not be using her extra year of eligibility (due to the COVID-19 pandemic) and would be declaring for the 2022 WNBA draft.

== Professional career ==
=== WNBA ===
==== Los Angeles Sparks (2022–present) ====
Burrell was selected 9th overall in the 2022 WNBA draft by the Los Angeles Sparks. She missed all but three games of her rookie season due to a foot injury.

Burrell did not make the Sparks roster following the 2023 training camp, but was signed to a hardship contract in May. Burrell was released from the hardship after 2 days. Burrell returned for a second hardship contract on June 17, 2023. She eventually stayed with the team for the rest of the season and played in 29 games, averaging 11.1 minutes per game.

On February 1, 2024, Burrell signed a multi-year contract with the Sparks. She played sporadically at the beginning of the season, but gradually carved out more and more playing time. She ended up playing in 37 games, starting the last 7 games of the season, averaging 15.6 minutes per game.

=== Overseas ===
Burrell played with the UC Capitals in the 2022–23 WNBL season.

She joined the Belgian side Kangoeroes Basket Mechelen for winter 2023.

=== Athletes Unlimited ===
Burrell played in the 2024 edition of Athletes Unlimited Pro Basketball.

=== Unrivaled ===
On November 18, 2024, it was announced that Burrell would appear and play in the inaugural 2025 season of Unrivaled, the women’s 3-on-3 basketball league founded by Napheesa Collier and Breanna Stewart.

=== Los Angeles Sparks (2024–present) ===
Following an injury-hampered start to her professional career, Burrell established herself as a core rotational piece and reliable scoring option for the Los Angeles Sparks. During the 2024 and 2025 seasons, she transitioned into a productive "sixth woman" role, providing a scoring punch off the bench and filling in as a starter during backcourt injuries. In September 2025, she recorded a then-career-high 20 points, along with 5 rebounds and 2 assists, in a victory over the Phoenix Mercury.

On April 13, 2026, the Sparks announced they had re-signed Burrell to a one-year contract extension. Sparks General Manager Raegan Pebley praised her development, calling her a "modern, versatile wing who has the ability to impact the game on both ends." During the 2026 regular season, Burrell's role expanded significantly. On June 22, 2026, she played a key role in a 98–97 victory against the New York Liberty, scoring 19 points, grabbing 3 rebounds, and dishing out 4 assists in 26 minutes of play.

=== Other Professional Leagues ===
Beyond her career in the traditional WNBA, Burrell signed to play in the newly established 3-on-3 women's professional basketball league, Unrivaled, where she was assigned to the Vinyl roster. She was named to Hive for the 2027 season.

== Career statistics ==
Legend
GP	Games played	GS	Games started	MPG	Minutes per game	RPG	Rebounds per game
APG	Assists per game	SPG	Steals per game	BPG	Blocks per game	PPG	Points per game
TO	Turnovers per game	FG%	Field-goal percentage	3P%	3-point field-goal percentage	FT%	Free-throw percentage
**Bold**	Career best	°	League leader

=== WNBA ===
==== Regular season ====
NBA regular season statistics
Year	Team	GP	GS	MPG	FG%	3P%	FT%	RPG	APG	SPG	BPG	TO	PPG
2022	Los Angeles	3	1	14.7	.111	.167	**1.000**	1.0	.3	.7	.0	**.3**	1.7
2023	Los Angeles	29	3	11.1	.387	**.390**	.810	1.2	0.6	.4	.1	.5	3.6
2024	Los Angeles	37	7	15.6	.362	.333	.780	1.8	1.1	**.8**	.3	1.0	5.9
2025	Los Angeles	28	1	18.4	.433	.328	.745	**2.3**	1.2	.6	.2	.9	7.5
2026	Los Angeles	**43**	**35**	**28.8**	**.455**	.383	.814	**2.3**	**2.5**	**.8**	**.6**	2.4	**14.6**
**Career**	5 years, 1 team	140	47	19.3	.424	.361	.794	2.0	1.4	.7	.3	1.3	8.3

=== College ===
NCAA statistics
Year	Team	GP	GS	MPG	FG%	3P%	FT%	RPG	APG	SPG	BPG	TO	PPG
2018–19	Tennessee	**32**	0	12.6	.317	.219	.568	2.8	.4	.2	.3	**.9**	3.6
2019–20	Tennessee	31	9	22.6	.410	.328	.600	**5.5**	1.4	.7	**.5**	2.4	10.5
2020–21	Tennessee	25	**25**	**32.0**	**.458**	**.402**	**.825**	4.6	**1.8**	**1.0**	.4	2.8	**16.8**
2021–22	Tennessee	22	13	26.5	.364	.325	.794	3.9	1.6	.6	.3	2.0	12.3
**Career**		110	47	22.6	.402	.341	.703	4.2	1.3	.6	.4	2.0	10.3
