= Rickea Jackson =

American basketball player (born 2001)

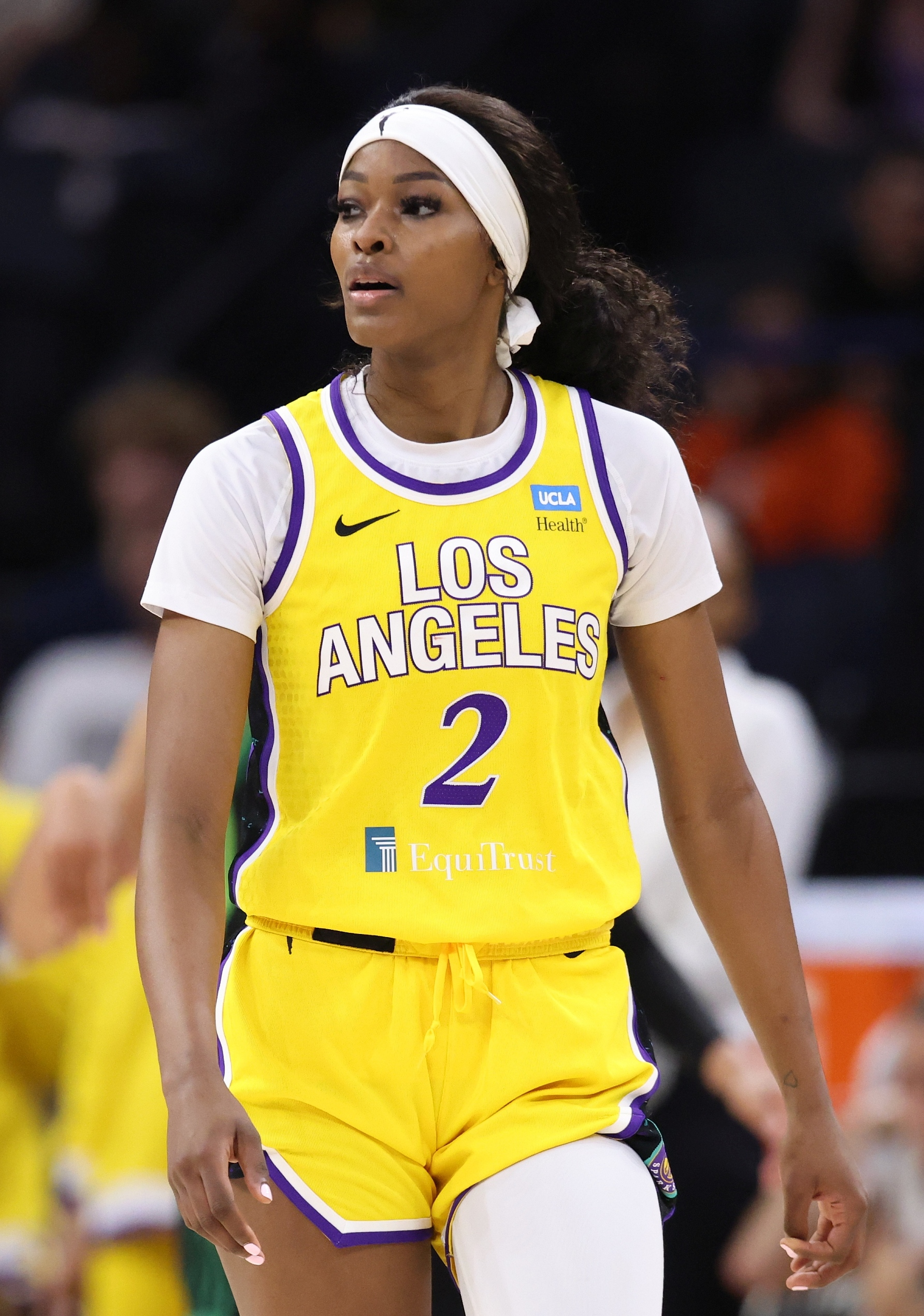
- Jackson with the Los Angeles Sparks in 2024

No. 5 – Chicago Sky
- Position: Small forward
- League: WNBA

Personal information
- Born: March 16, 2001 (age 25) Detroit, Michigan, U.S.
- Listed height: 6 ft 2 in (1.88 m)
- Listed weight: 175 lb (79 kg)

Career information
- High school: Detroit Edison (Detroit, Michigan)
- College: Mississippi State (2019–2022); Tennessee (2022–2024)
- WNBA draft: 2024: 1st round, 4th overall pick
- Drafted by: Los Angeles Sparks
- Playing career: 2024–present

Career history
- 2024–2025: Los Angeles Sparks
- 2025: Mist BC
- 2026–present: Breeze BC
- 2026–present: Chicago Sky

Career highlights
- WNBA All-Rookie Team (2024); 2× First-team All-SEC (2023, 2024); Second-team All-SEC (2020); SEC All-Freshman Team (2020); Gillom Trophy (2020); McDonald's All-American (2019); Michigan Miss Basketball (2019)
- Stats at Basketball Reference
Medals
Women's basketball
Representing the United States
FIBA AmeriCup
Silver medal – second place	2023 Mexico	Team
Summer Universiade
Silver medal – second place	2019 Italy	Team
Women's 3x3 basketball
Representing the United States
FIBA 3x3 U18 World Cup
Gold medal – first place	2019 Mongolia

Rickea Velece Jackson (/rɪˈkiːə/ rih-KEE-ə, born March 16, 2001) is an American professional basketball player for the Chicago Sky of the Women's National Basketball Association (WNBA) and for the Breeze of Unrivaled. She played college basketball at Tennessee and Mississippi State.

== Early life ==
Jackson played basketball for Detroit Edison Public School Academy in Detroit, Michigan. She led her team to three consecutive Class C state titles. As a senior, Jackson averaged 22 points and 6.5 rebounds per game, earning Michigan Miss Basketball honors and being selected to the McDonald's All-American Game and Jordan Brand Classic. She was named Michigan Gatorade Player of the Year for a second time. Jackson left as the program's all-time leading scorer, with 1,771 points. Mick McCabe of the Detroit Free Press considered her the greatest girls high school player in state history. Rated a five-star recruit and the fifth-best player in her class by ESPN, she committed to play college basketball for Mississippi State over offers from South Carolina, Tennessee, Texas, Rutgers, Ohio State and Louisville.

== College career ==
On February 20, 2020, Jackson scored a freshman season-high 34 points for Mississippi State in a 92–85 win against Auburn in overtime. As a freshman, she averaged 15.1 points and 5.1 rebounds per game, earning second-team All-Southeastern Conference (SEC) and All-Freshman honors. Jackson won the Gillom Trophy as the top women's college player in Mississippi. In her sophomore season, she averaged 14.9 points and 4.4 rebounds per game. On December 1, 2021, Jackson scored a career-high 40 points in a 102–55 win over McNeese State.

In January 2022, she entered the transfer portal, averaging an SEC-best 20.3 points and 6.7 rebounds per game in her junior season. Jackson announced on March 22, 2022, that she would transfer to Tennessee. On March 3, 2023, she scored a senior season-high 34 points in an 80–71 win over Kentucky at the SEC tournament, setting the tournament single-game scoring record. As a senior, Jackson averaged 19.2 points and 6.1 rebounds per game and was named first-team All-SEC. Despite being a projected first-round pick in the 2023 WNBA draft, she returned to Tennessee for a fifth season of eligibility, granted due to the COVID-19 pandemic. She averaged 20.2 points and 8.2 rebounds per game and repeated as a first-team All-SEC selection.

== Professional career ==
=== WNBA ===
==== Los Angeles Sparks (2024–2025) ====
On April 15, 2024, Jackson was selected by the Los Angeles Sparks (via the Seattle Storm) as the fourth overall pick in the 2024 WNBA draft. On May 15, in an 81–92 loss to the Atlanta Dream, Jackson made her WNBA debut, scoring 7 points in 18 minutes off the bench. On May 28, in an 88–82 win over the Indiana Fever, Jackson made her first start, scoring 12 points in 23 minutes. She remained a starter for the rest of the season and her role gradually increased. On August 25, in a 110–113 loss to the Dallas Wings, Jackson recorded 25 points, 4 assists, 3 blocks, and 6 made three-pointers — all career highs. On September 17, in an 81–85 loss to the Phoenix Mercury, Jackson was involved in a confrontation with Mercury player Brittney Griner, leading to both players being ejected. In her rookie season, Jackson played in all 40 regular-season games, starting 35, and averaged 13.4 points, 3.9 rebounds and 1.5 assists. She was also named to the 2024 WNBA All-Rookie Team. Despite Jackson's contributions, the Sparks, ravaged by injuries, won only 8 games all season and finished 12th in the league.

==== Chicago Sky (2026–present) ====
On April 12, 2026, Jackson was traded to the Chicago Sky in exchange for Ariel Atkins.

On May 17, Jackson suffered an apparent knee injury during the Sky’s 86-79 win against the Minnesota Lynx, which test results later revealed to be a left torn ACL, ending her season.

=== Unrivaled ===
On September 3, 2024, it was announced that Jackson would appear and play in the inaugural season of Unrivaled, a new women's 3-on-3 basketball league founded by Napheesa Collier and Breanna Stewart. She played for Mist BC in the 2025 Unrivaled season.

On November 5, 2025, it was announced that Jackson had been drafted by Breeze BC for the 2026 Unrivaled season.

== National team career ==
Jackson represented the United States alongside her Mississippi State teammates at the 2019 Summer Universiade in Italy. She led the tournament with 22.2 points per game and won a silver medal. Jackson won a silver medal at the 2023 FIBA Women's AmeriCup in Mexico, where she averaged a team-high 14.6 points and 4.9 rebounds per game, earning all-tournament honors.

In 3x3 basketball, Jackson played at the 2019 FIBA 3x3 U18 World Cup in Mongolia, where she helped her team win the gold medal and was named to the all-tournament team.

== Career statistics ==
Legend
GP	Games played	GS	Games started	MPG	Minutes per game	RPG	Rebounds per game
APG	Assists per game	SPG	Steals per game	BPG	Blocks per game	PPG	Points per game
TO	Turnovers per game	FG%	Field-goal percentage	3P%	3-point field-goal percentage	FT%	Free-throw percentage
**Bold**	Career best	°	League leader

=== WNBA ===
Stats current through end of 2026 season

WNBA regular season statistics
Year	Team	GP	GS	MPG	FG%	3P%	FT%	RPG	APG	SPG	BPG	TO	PPG
2024	Los Angeles	**40**	35	28.8	**.456**	.347	.807	**3.9**	1.5	**0.7**	**0.4**	**1.9**	13.4
2025	Los Angeles	38	**37**	**30.9**	.424	**.348**	**.847**	3.2	**1.7**	0.6	**0.4**	2.1	**14.7**
2026	Chicago	4	4	29.5	.400	.286	.818	4.8	2.0	0.3	1.8	2.0	18.0
**Career**	3 years, 2 teams	82	76	29.8	.437	.344	.825	3.7	1.6	0.6	0.5	2.0	14.2

=== College ===
NCAA statistics
Year	Team	GP	GS	MPG	FG%	3P%	FT%	RPG	APG	SPG	BPG	TO	PPG
2019–20	Mississippi State	33	**27**	30.1	48.3	**41.9**	72.4	5.1	1.2	0.8	0.6	2.5	15.1
2020–21	Mississippi State	19	16	31.6	42.0	29.5	54.7	4.4	2.0	0.7	0.4	2.9	14.9
2021–22	Mississippi State	15	15	**34.9**	41.0	24.3	73.0	6.8	1.1	**0.9**	**1.5**	**1.8**	**20.3**
2022–23	Tennessee	**35**	24	28.3	**54.8**	31.4	**79.2**	6.1	1.4	0.8	0.5	2.6	19.2
2023–24	Tennessee	25	24	31.5	48.5	33.8	78.0	**8.2**	**2.3**	0.7	0.2	2.9	20.2
**Career**		127	106	30.7	47.9	30.9	74.2	6.1	1.6	0.8	0.6	2.6	17.8

== Personal life ==
Rickea and fellow WNBA player Betnijah Laney-Hamilton share a godmother, Debra Walker, who played with Laney-Hamilton's mother Yolanda on the historic Cheyney State Lady Wolves basketball team.

In July 2024, Jackson became the first WNBA player to sign a shoe deal with Skechers.

On February 7, 2026, Jackson was the victim of a domestic dispute in Miami-Dade County, Florida, which resulted in James Pearce Jr. being arrested on two charges of aggravated battery with a deadly weapon and one count of aggravated stalking.
