= Breeze BC =

- League: Unrivaled
- Founded: 2025
- History: Breeze BC; 2026–present
- Arena: Sephora Arena
- Location: Miami, Florida
- Team colors
- Head coach: Noelle Quinn (2026–present)
- Team captain: Paige Bueckers (2026)
- Ownership: Unrivaled
- Website: Breeze BC

Breeze Basketball Club, also known as Breeze BC, is an American professional 3x3 basketball team. Breeze is a member of the Unrivaled basketball league since the 2026 season. The team is based in Miami, Florida, and is led by head coach Noelle Quinn.

== History ==
On October 24, 2024, the Unrivaled basketball league announced the names and logos of six teams joining its league: Laces BC, Lunar Owls BC, Mist BC, Phantom BC, Rose BC, and Vinyl BC. On September 10, 2025, Unrivaled announced they are adding two new teams to the league, Breeze BC and Hive BC.

On November 3, 2025, the league announced the details of the 2026 draft on its social media. With the addition of two new teams, a draft involving all clubs was organized. The two expansion teams, Breeze and Hive, received the first picks, with Breeze winning a coin toss that secured them the first overall pick, which they used to draft Paige Bueckers, who was appointed team captain. The rest of the roster included Rickea Jackson, Dominique Malonga, Aari McDonald, Kate Martin, and Cameron Brink.

=== 2026 season ===
Breeze made its Unrivaled debut on January 5, 2026, with a 69–62 win over Phantom. Paige Bueckers scored the first basket in club history and led the team with 24 points, while Dominique Malonga recorded 14 rebounds.

On January 19, in an 83–64 win against Mist, Bueckers scored 37 points, setting the team's single-game scoring record, while Malonga recorded 16 rebounds. That same night, Bueckers won the league's first Free Throw Challenge, receiving a $50,000 prize after making 13-of-13 free throws in the first five games of the season.

On January 24, in a 75–68 win over Lunar Owls, Dominique Malonga threw down the second dunk in Unrivaled history, and the first one of the 2026 season, in addition to scoring 21 points. Breeze lost their next two games and finished the month with a 4–4 record. On February 1, in an 81–56 win over Rose, Breeze's largest victory this season, the starting trio combined for 70 points: Paige Bueckers scored 32, Rickea Jackson 20, and Dominique Malonga 18. Bueckers and Malonga also recorded double-doubles, with 11 assists and 11 rebounds, respectively.

On February 9, the league announced that Aari McDonald had been ruled out for the remainder of the season due to a right lower extremity injury. As a result, Breeze acquired Courtney Williams from Vinyl BC in a three-team trade. On February 17, in an 75–70 loss to the Lunar Owls, Malonga had her second dunk of the season, becoming the first player in the league to dunk more than once, in addition to scoring a career-high 29 points.

On February 21, in a 77–56 win over Vinyl, Breeze set a single-game record for blocks with 10 total; Cameron Brink and Dominique Malonga recorded four each, and Paige Bueckers added two. The following day, Breeze secured a playoff spot after Hive lost to Phantom. Breeze lost its last two games of the regular season, finishing the month with a 2–4 record and the season 6–8.

On February 28, Paige Bueckers was named to the All-Unrivaled First Team after averaging 22.1 points, 6.1 rebounds, and 5.5 assists per game in her first season in the league.

In the first round of the playoffs on February 28, Breeze faced Rose, the 2025 champions. Bueckers scored 29 points, Malonga recorded a double-double with 14 points and 17 rebounds, and Jackson added 9 points in the 69–50 win. On March 2, Breeze faced Mist in the semifinals. The team started the game with a 13–0 run and ended the first quarter with a 16-point lead, but Mist cut into the deficit and trailed by six points at halftime. Breeze entered the fourth quarter with a seven-point lead but were defeated 73–69, ending their season.

== Season-by-season records ==
Season	Standings	Regular season			Playoff results	Head coach
Season	Standings	W	L	PCT	Playoff results	Head coach
Breeze BC
2026	5th	6	8	.429	Won first round (Rose, 69–50); Lost semifinals (Mist, 73–69)	Noelle Quinn
Regular season		6	8	.429	0 Unrivaled championships	
Playoffs		1	1	.500	0 Unrivaled championships	

== Roster ==
Breeze BC roster - 2026
Players
Pos.	No.	Nat.	Name	Height	DOB	2025 WNBA team
F	2	(United States)	Rickea Jackson	6' 2" (1.88m)	2001-03-16	Los Angeles Sparks
G	3	(United States)	Aari McDonald	5' 6" (1.68m)	1998-08-20	Indiana Fever
G	5	(United States)	Paige Bueckers	6' 0" (1.83m)	2001-10-20	Dallas Wings
G	10	(United States)	Courtney Williams	5' 8" (1.73m)	1994-05-11	Minnesota Lynx
C	14	(France)	Dominique Malonga	6' 6" (1.98m)	2005-11-16	Seattle Storm
G	20	(United States)	Kate Martin	6' 0" (1.83m)	2000-06-05	Golden State Valkyries
F	22	(United States)	Cameron Brink	6' 4" (1.93m)	2001-12-31	Los Angeles Sparks

Breeze BC roster - 2027
Players
Pos.	No.	Nat.	Name	Height	DOB	2025 WNBA team
F	2	(United States)	Kahleah Copper	6' 1" (1.85m)	1994-08-28	Phoenix Mercury
F	21	(United States)	DiJonai Carrington	5' 11" (1.80m)	1998-01-08	Chicago Sky
G	5	(United States)	Paige Bueckers	6' 0" (1.83m)	2001-10-20	Dallas Wings
G	2	(United States)	Kaitlyn Chen	5' 9" (1.75m)	2002-02-22	Golden State Valkyries
C	14	(France)	Dominique Malonga	6' 6" (1.98m)	2005-11-16	Seattle Storm
F	25	(United States)	Monique Billings	6' 4" (1.93m)	1996-05-02	Indiana Fever

== Honors and awards ==
- 2026 Free Throw Challenge: Paige Bueckers
- 2026 All-Unrivaled First Team: Paige Bueckers
