= Rena Wakama =

Nigerian basketball coach

Rena Wakama, OON
Chicago Sky
- Position: Assistant coach

Personal information
- Born: April 11, 1992 (age 34) Raleigh, North Carolina, U.S.
- Listed height: 5 ft 7 in (1.70 m)

Career information
- High school: Wake Forest-Rolesville (Wake Forest, North Carolina)
- College: Western Carolina University; Manhattan College
- Coaching career: 2017–present

Career history

Coaching
- 2017–2023: Manhattan (assistant)
- 2023–present: Nigeria
- 2023–2024: Stony Brook (assistant)
- 2024–2025: Tulane (assistant)
- 2025–present: Chicago Sky (assistant)
- 2026–present: Hive BC

Rena Wakama, OON (born 11 April 1992) is a Nigerian professional basketball coach and former player who is the head coach for the Nigeria national team, the head coach for the Hive BC, and an assistant coach for the Chicago Sky.

== Early life and education ==
Wakama was born in Raleigh, North Carolina, USA to Johnson Wakama and Rosana Oba whom are natives of Okrika, Rivers State, Nigeria. She holds a bachelor's degree in Therapeutic Recreation from the Western Carolina University, and a master's degree in Business Administration from Manhattan College.

== Career ==
Wakama's love for basketball was inspired by her cousin; Onimisi Aiyede at a young age.

=== As a player ===
While she was at WCU, she played for the Western Carolina Catamounts for four years. Immediately she left college, she joined the D'Tigress where she played for the team at the 2015 Women's Afrobasket tournament in Cameroon where Nigeria finished third. She also represented Nigeria's First Bank at the FIBA Africa Champions Cup for Women during her career as a player.

=== As a coach ===
For her first two years at Manhattan College, she served as the director of women's basketball operations, she became an assistant coach in her third year where she kept on developing talents while serving as the team's academics and community service liaison.

In 2023, she became the first female Head Coach of D’Tigress, and became the first Nigerian National Female Basketball Team coach to win the FIBA AfroBasket Women competition since it began in 1966. At the 2024 Olympic Games in Paris, under her leadership, Nigeria’s D’Tigress became the first African team, male or female, to qualify for the quarterfinals of basketball at the Olympics after beating Canada 79-70. She was awarded the Best Coach of the tournament by FIBA for guiding the Nigerian team to a historic outing at the Paris 2024 Olympics. D’Tigress won their fifth consecutive AfroBasket title and seventh overall, defeating Mali 78–64 in the final in Abidjan. This victory extended their unbroken winning streak in AfroBasket games since 2015 and made them the first African team to qualify for the 2026 FIBA Women’s World Cup pre-qualifier. Following their historic victory at the 2025 FIBA Women’s AfroBasket Championship, President Bola Ahmed Tinubu awarded them cash prizes, housing, and national honours. Each player received US $100,000, a bedroom flat, and was conferred the National honour of the Officer of the Order of the Niger (OON). Each of the 11-member coaching/technical staff received US $50,000, the same housing allocation, and also received OON honours.
