= Hive BC =

- League: Unrivaled
- Founded: 2025
- History: Hive BC; 2026–present
- Arena: Sephora Arena
- Location: Miami, Florida
- Team colors
- Head coach: Rena Wakama (2026–present)
- Team captain: Sonia Citron (2026)
- Ownership: Unrivaled
- Website: Hive BC

Hive Basketball Club, also known as Hive BC, is an American professional 3x3 basketball team. Hive is a member of the Unrivaled basketball league since the 2026 season. The team is based in Miami, Florida, and is led by head coach Rena Wakama.

== History ==
On October 24, 2024, the Unrivaled basketball league announced the names and logos of six teams joining its league: Laces BC, Lunar Owls BC, Mist BC, Phantom BC, Rose BC, and Vinyl BC. On September 10, 2025, Unrivaled announced they are adding two new teams to the league, Hive BC and Breeze BC.

On November 3, 2025, the league announced the details of the 2026 draft on its social media. With the addition of two new teams, a draft involving all clubs was organized. The two expansion teams, Hive and Breeze, received the first picks, with Hive losing a coin toss and receiving the second overall pick, which was used to draft Kelsey Mitchell. The rest of the roster included Sonia Citron, who was appointed team captain, Ezi Magbegor, Natisha Hiedeman, Saniya Rivers, and Monique Billings.

2026

Hive made its Unrivaled debut on January 5, 2026, with a 72–56 loss to Mist. Monique Billings started the season with a double-double coming off the bench, with 16 points and 10 rebounds. On January 16, Hive ended a three-game losing streak by defeating defending champions Rose 78–75. Kelsey Mitchell led the team with 24 points, and Billings recorded another double-double with 12 points and 10 rebounds. On January 26, Hive earned their second win of the season by defeating Lunar Owls 74–71. Natisha Hiedeman led the team with 20 points off the bench, and Billings recorded her third double-double in the last four games, with 16 points and 14 rebounds. Hive finished the month with a 2–6 record. On February 2, in a 74–71 loss to Vinyl, Sonia Citron led all players with a career-high 32 points, and Billings recorded her third consecutive double-double with 23 points and 15 rebounds, both career highs. On February 6, in a 70–68 win over Breeze, the Hive overcame a 15-point deficit to defeat Breeze and complete the largest comeback in league history. On February 9, Hive traded Saniya Rivers to Vinyl and received Azurá Stevens from Rose in a three-team trade. On February 20, in an 80–78 win over Rose, Mitchell scored a career-high 27 points, Stevens added 20 points off the bench in her second game with the team, and Billings recorded her eighth double-double of the season with 18 points and 10 rebounds. Hive lost their last two games of the regular season and finished the month with a 2–4 record and the season 4–10, placing them last in the standings and out of the playoffs.

== Season-by-season records ==
Season	Standings	Regular season			Playoff results	Head coach
Season	Standings	W	L	PCT	Playoff results	Head coach
Hive BC
2026	8th	4	10	.286	Did not qualify	Rena Wakama
Regular season		4	10	.286	0 Unrivaled championships	
Playoffs		0	0	–	0 Unrivaled championships	

== Roster ==
Hive BC roster - 2026
Players
Pos.	No.	Nat.	Name	Height	DOB	WNBA team
G	0	(United States)	Kelsey Mitchell	5' 8" (1.73m)	1995-11-12	Indiana Fever
G	2	(United States)	Natisha Hiedeman	5' 8" (1.73m)	1997-02-10	Seattle Storm
G	11	(United States)	Sonia Citron	6' 1" (1.85m)	2003-10-22	Washington Mystics
F/C	13	(Australia)	Ezi Magbegor	6' 4" (1.93m)	1999-08-13	Seattle Storm
F/C	23	(United States)	Azurá Stevens	6' 6" (1.98m)	1996-02-01	Los Angeles Sparks
F	25	(United States)	Monique Billings	6' 4" (1.93m)	1996-05-02	Golden State Valkyries

Hive BC roster - 2027
Players
Pos.	No.	Nat.	Name	Height	DOB	WNBA team
G	5	(United States)	Olivia Miles	5' 10" (1.78m)	2003-01-29	Minnesota Lynx
G	2	(United States)	Natisha Hiedeman	5' 8" (1.73m)	1997-02-10	Seattle Storm
G	11	(United States)	Sonia Citron	6' 1" (1.85m)	2003-10-22	Washington Mystics
F/C	22	(United States)	Cameron Brink	6' 4" (1.93m)	2001-12-31	Los Angeles Sparks
G	12	(United States)	Rae Burrell	6' 2" (1.88m)	2000-06-21	Los Angeles Sparks
F	00	(United States)	Naz Hillmon	6' 2" (1.88m)	2000-04-05	Atlanta Dream
