= Lunar Owls BC =

- League: Unrivaled
- Founded: 2025
- History: Lunar Owls BC; 2025–present
- Location: Miami, Florida
- Team colors
- Head coach: Pokey Chatman
- Team captain: Napheesa Collier (2025-present)
- Ownership: Unrivaled
- Website: www.unrivaled.basketball/lunar-owls

Lunar Owls Basketball Club, also known as Lunar Owls BC, is an American professional basketball team. They are a member of the Unrivaled basketball league, and made their debut in January 2025. The teams are based in Miami, Florida and the Owls are led by coach Pokey Chatman.

== History ==
On October 24, 2024, the Unrivaled basketball league announced the names and logos of six teams joining its league, which are Laces BC, Lunar Owls BC, Mist BC, Rose BC, Phantom BC and Vinyl BC. Lunar Owls BC, along with the other five teams, are based in Miami, Florida for the inaugural 2025 season, before the teams began travelling more frequently during the 2026 season. Alex Bazzell, the president of Unrivaled, confirmed the league owns all six teams. Six head coaches were later hired on November 15.

On September 10, 2025, Unrivaled announced they were adding two new teams to the league, Breeze BC and Hive BC.

== Roster ==
=== 2025 season ===
On November 20, 2024, the six head coaches collaborated on balancing and choosing the rosters for the six teams. After the selection show, Lunar Owls BC's roster was finalized with Napheesa Collier, Allisha Gray, Skylar Diggins, Shakira Austin, Natasha Cloud, and a wildcard spot.

On December 17, 2024, Cameron Brink signed a multiyear deal with the Lunar Owls; however, she would not appear in the league until the 2026 season due to injury. On December 21, 2024, Laces BC traded Courtney Williams to Lunar Owls BC in exchange for Natasha Cloud.

All-Time Lunar Owls Rosters
Players
2025	Napheesa Collier	Allisha Gray	Skylar Diggins	Shakira Austin	Courtney Williams	Cameron Brink
2026	Napheesa Collier	Aaliyah Edwards	Rebecca Allen	Skylar Diggins	Marina Mabrey	Rachel Banham
2027	Napheesa Collier	Marina Mabrey	Skylar Diggins	Sydney Taylor	Courtney Williams	Temi Fagbenle

=== Head coaches ===
Lunar Owls BC head coaches
Name	Start	End	Seasons	Regular season				Playoffs			
Name	Start	End	Seasons	W	L	PCT	G	W	L	PCT	G
DJ Sackman	November 20, 2024	November 4, 2026	2	17	11	.607	28	0	1	.000	0
Pokey Chatman	November 4, 2026	Present	1	0	0	.000	0	0	0	.000	0

== Season-by-season records ==
Season	Standings	Regular season			Playoff results	Head coach
Season	Standings	W	L	PCT	Playoff results	Head coach
Lunar Owls BC
2025	1st	13	1	.929	Lost Semifinals (Vinyl, 73–70)	DJ Sackman
2026	7th	4	10	.286	Did Not Qualify	DJ Sackman
Regular season		17	11	.607	0 Unrivaled championships	
Playoffs		0	1	.000	0 Unrivaled championships	

== Season Recaps ==
=== 2025 ===
Lunar Owls won their opening game after coming back from behind against the Mist, with Skylar Diggins scoring the winning three. Diggins was named to the Second Team.

Napheesa Collier was champion of the 1-on-1 tournament. Collier was named to the First Team, while she led the league in scoring with 25.7 points per game.

=== 2026 ===
On January 30, the game against Rose broke the all-time attendance record for a professional women's basketball game, with an audience of 21,490. In this game, Marina Mabrey scored 47 points, breaking the Unrivaled record for most points in a game. She broke the record for most three-point shots made in a game, scoring 10 threes. Her 27 points in the first quarter are the most in any quarter in Unrivaled. Quarters are 7 minutes long.

Marina Mabrey averaged 25.3 points per game, the most in the league. Aaliyah Edwards averaged the most rebounds at 12.4 per game.

== Honors and awards ==
- All-Unrivaled First Team: Naphessa Collier (2025)
- All-Unrivaled Second Team: Skylar Diggins (2025)
- League MVP: Naphessa Collier (2025)
