= Zach O'Brien (basketball) =

American basketball coach

Los Angeles Sparks
- Position: Assistant coach
- League: WNBA

Personal information
- Born: Schenectady, New York, U.S.

Career information
- High school: Notre Dame-Bishop Gibbons
- College: Saint Joseph's College of Maine
- NBA draft: 2012: undrafted
- Coaching career: 2019–present

Career history

Coaching
- 2020–2021: Phoenix Mercury (player dev.)
- 2022–2025: New York Liberty (assistant)
- 2026–present: Los Angeles Sparks (assistant)
- 2026–present: Mist BC

Career highlights
- As head coach: Unrivaled champion (2026); As assistant coach: WNBA champion (2024); WNBA Commissioner's Cup Champion (2023)

Zach O'Brien is an assistant coach for Los Angeles Sparks of the Women's National Basketball Association (WNBA).

== Early life and education ==
O'Brien is from Schenectady, New York, where he attended Notre Dame-Bishop Gibbons High School. He played basketball at Saint Joseph's College of Maine where he scored more than 1,500 career points for the Monks, earning Great Northeast Athletic Conference All-First Team honors as a senior in 2011–12. He graduated in 2012. He subsequently played two years for Oxford Brookes University in England.

== Coaching career ==
Prior to the Liberty, he was the Director of Player Development of the Phoenix Mercury. His professional coaching career began as a video coordinator for the Mercury (2019) and the Northern Arizona Suns (2019–2020) in the NBA G League.

On December 3, 2025 he was announced as an assistant coach for the Los Angeles Sparks.
