= Azurá Stevens =

American basketball player (born 1996)

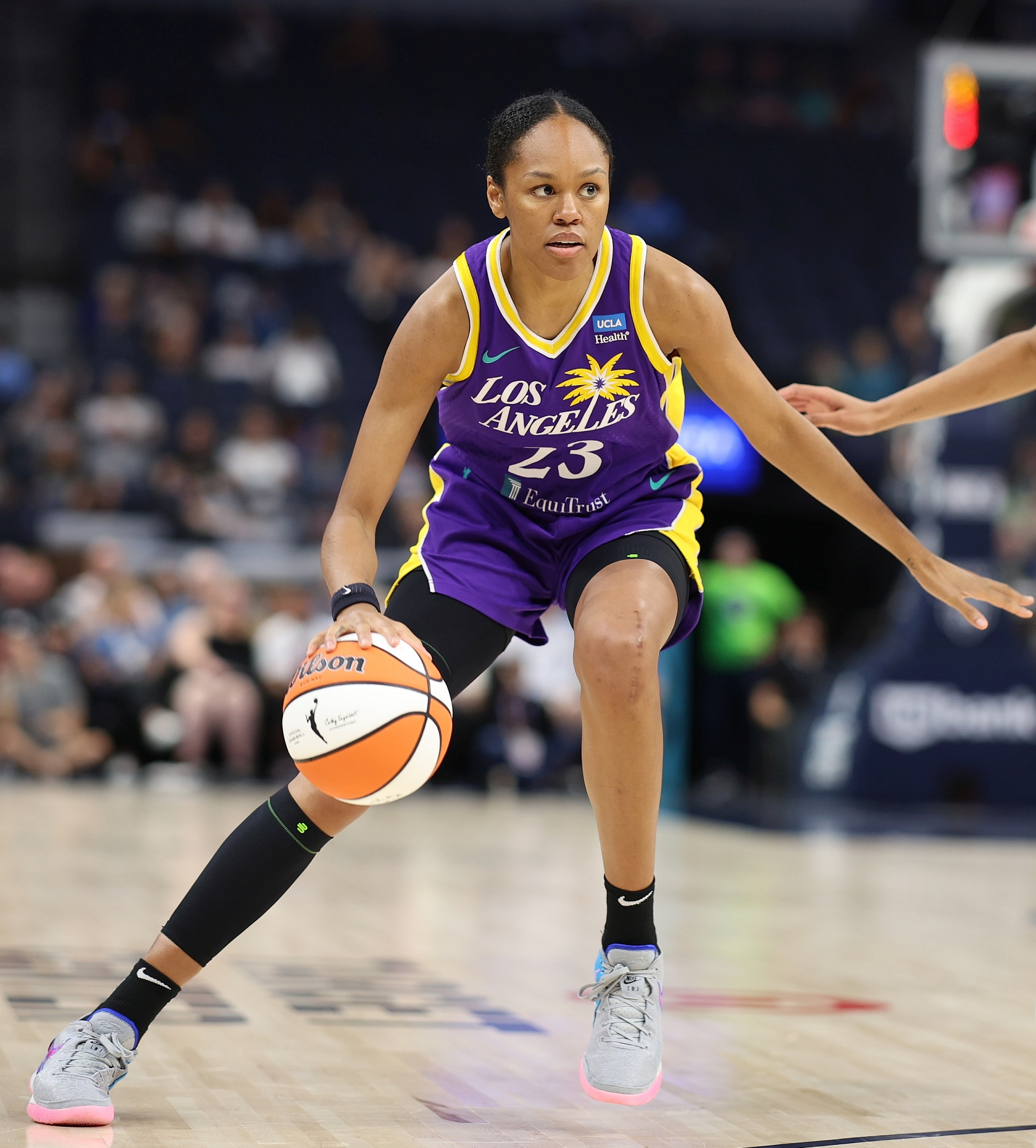
- Stevens with the Los Angeles Sparks in 2023

No. 30 – Chicago Sky
- Position: Power forward / center
- League: WNBA

Personal information
- Born: February 1, 1996 (age 30) Pawtucket, Rhode Island, U.S.
- Listed height: 6 ft 6 in (1.98 m)
- Listed weight: 180 lb (82 kg)

Career information
- High school: Cary (Cary, North Carolina)
- College: Duke (2014–2016); UConn (2017–2018)
- WNBA draft: 2018: 1st round, 6th overall pick
- Drafted by: Dallas Wings
- Playing career: 2018–present

Career history
- 2018–2019: Dallas Wings
- 2018–2019: Hebei Win Power
- 2020–2022: Chicago Sky
- 2021–2022: Nika Syktyvkar
- 2022–2023: Galatasaray
- 2023–2025: Los Angeles Sparks
- 2024: Xinjiang Magic Deer
- 2025: Rose BC
- 2026–present: Chicago Sky

Career highlights
- WNBA champion (2021); WNBA All-Rookie Team (2018); Unrivaled champion (2025); Second-team All-ACC (2015); Second-team All-AAC (2018); AAC Sixth Player of the Year (2018); AAC Newcomer of the Year (2018); AAC Tournament MVP (2018); First-team All-ACC (2016); ACC All-Defensive Team (2016); ACC All-Freshman Team (2015)
- Stats at Basketball Reference
Medals
Women's 3x3 basketball
Representing the United States
FIBA 3x3 AmeriCup
Silver medal – second place	2024 San Juan	Team
Pan American Games
Gold medal – first place	2023 Santiago	Team
Women's basketball
Representing the United States
FIBA Under-19 World Cup
Gold medal – first place	2015 Russia	Team

Azurá Breeona Stevens (/ˌæzəˈreɪ/ az-ər-AY; born February 1, 1996) is an American professional basketball player for the Chicago Sky of the Women's National Basketball Association (WNBA) and for Hive BC of Unrivaled. Stevens played college basketball at Duke and UConn. She was drafted with the 6th overall pick in the 2018 WNBA draft by the Dallas Wings.

== Early life ==
Stevens was born in Pawtucket, Rhode Island, the daughter of Damon and Kaasha Stevens. She attended Cary High School in Cary, North Carolina, graduating in 2014. She played basketball at Cary High, where she averaged 30 points, 20 rebounds, and four blocks her senior year. As a sophomore and junior in high school, she played basketball with The Miracle League of the Triangle.

Stevens was an All-Academic selection all four years of high school. Her senior year, she was selected as an All-American by Parade Magazine. In 2014, she was selected for All-State by the Associated Press and for All-North Carolina First Team by USA Today.

== College career ==
Stevens played for the Duke Blue Devils during the 2014–15 and 2015-16 season. At Duke, she was named to the All-ACC Second Team as a freshman and to the First Team as a sophomore. She sat out the following due to transfer rules before playing for the UConn Huskies in the 2017-18 season. At UConn, she was named to the All-AAC Second Team and received the AAC Sixth Player of Year and AAC Newcomer of Year awards.

Stevens helped the UConn team win the American Athletic Conference Championship title in 2018. Despite coming off the bench, she was named the tournament's Most Outstanding Player.

== Professional career ==
=== WNBA ===
==== Dallas Wings (2018–2019) ====
In April 2018, Stevens decided to forgo her senior year of college and declare for the 2018 WNBA draft. She was a highly rated player expected to be taken in the first round of the draft, and noted for her ability to play "positionless" basketball.

In her rookie season for the Wings, Stevens mostly came off the bench, averaging 20.6 minutes, 8.9 points, and 4.6 rebounds per game, and was named to the WNBA All-Rookie Team. Although the Wings ended the season with a 15–19 losing record, they entered the playoffs as the eighth seed and lost in the first round to the Phoenix Mercury. Stevens missed most of the 2019 season with an injury, playing only 9 games where she averaged 16 minutes and 4.8 points per game. She later had surgery on her injured foot.

==== Chicago Sky (2020–2022) ====
Ahead of the 2020 season, the Wings traded Stevens to the Chicago Sky in exchange for Katie Lou Samuelson and first-round pick in the 2021 WNBA draft. In reporting ahead of the 2018 draft, multiple outlets had expected the Sky to draft Stevens with the third or fourth pick. With the Sky, Stevens was expected to fill a gap in the forward position created by the departure of Astou Ndour. Stevens won the 2021 WNBA Finals with the Sky.

==== Los Angeles Sparks (2023–2025) ====
Ahead of the 2023 season, Stevens signed a two-year contract with the Los Angeles Sparks. On August 22, 2024, Stevens signed a one-year contract extension with the Sparks.

==== Return to Chicago (2026-present) ====
Entering the 2026 season as a free agent, Stevens signed a three-year deal to return to the Chicago Sky.

=== Overseas ===
==== Galatasaray ====
On August 3, 2022, she signed with Galatasaray of the Turkish Women's Basketball Super League (TKBL). As of July 2023, her contract has expired. Galatasaray club said goodbye to the player on July 6, 2023 by publishing a thank you message.

=== Unrivaled ===
On October 3, 2024, it was announced that Stevens would appear and play in the inaugural season of Unrivaled, the women's 3-on-3 basketball league founded by Napheesa Collier and Breanna Stewart. She was selected for Rose BC. Rose won the first ever Unrivaled championship. Stevens had 19 points and 18 rebounds in the championship game.

== Career statistics ==
Legend
GP	Games played	GS	Games started	MPG	Minutes per game	RPG	Rebounds per game
APG	Assists per game	SPG	Steals per game	BPG	Blocks per game	PPG	Points per game
TO	Turnovers per game	FG%	Field-goal percentage	3P%	3-point field-goal percentage	FT%	Free-throw percentage
**Bold**	Career best	°	League leader

†	Denotes seasons in which Stevens won a WNBA championship

=== WNBA ===
==== Regular season ====
Stats current through end of 2026 season

WNBA regular season statistics
Year	Team	GP	GS	MPG	FG%	3P%	FT%	RPG	APG	SPG	BPG	TO	PPG
2018	Dallas	34	9	20.6	.430	.318	.788	4.6	1.3	0.9	1.1	1.5	8.9
2019	Dallas	9	1	16.0	.358	.111	.800	3.6	0.6	0.6	1.1	1.0	4.8
2020	Chicago	13	13	27.3	**.500**	**.385**	**.850**	5.9	1.5	0.9	**1.8**	1.5	11.5
2021^{†}	Chicago	30	11	19.6	**.500**	.333	.813	4.6	0.8	0.8	0.7	0.9	7.4
2022	Chicago	35	8	21.9	.472	.362	.744	3.9	0.8	0.5	1.1	**0.7**	10.6
2023	Los Angeles	35	29	26.0	.404	.321	.754	5.9	1.1	**1.2**	0.9	1.5	10.8
2024	Los Angeles	20	19	24.7	.399	.350	.815	7.0	1.9	0.9	0.9	1.8	9.6
2025	Los Angeles	**44**°	**44**°	**28.4**	.478	.381	.790	**8.0**	**2.1**	**1.2**	1.1	1.5	**12.8**
2026	Chicago	32	31	24.5	.426	.255	.779	6.4	**2.1**	0.8	0.8	1.6	10.6
**Career**	9 years, 3 teams	252	165	23.8	.446	.337	.785	5.7	1.4	0.9	1.0	1.3	10.2

==== Playoffs ====
WNBA playoff statistics
Year	Team	GP	GS	MPG	FG%	3P%	FT%	RPG	APG	SPG	BPG	TO	PPG
2018	Dallas	1	0	13.0	**1.000**	**1.000**	.000	2.0	0.0	0.0	0.0	**0.0**	7.0
2021^{†}	Chicago	**10**	**10**	**25.4**	.477	.263	**.786**	**6.9**	**0.8**	0.7	0.8	0.9	**9.8**
2022	Chicago	8	0	18.8	.472	.188	.667	3.8	0.5	**1.0**	**0.9**	0.8	7.4
**Career**	3 years, 2 teams	19	10	21.9	.486	.250	.739	5.3	0.6	0.8	0.8	0.8	8.6

=== College ===
NCAA statistics
Year	Team	GP	GS	MPG	FG%	3P%	FT%	RPG	APG	SPG	BPG	TO	PPG
2014–15	Duke	33	**25**	28.8	.512	.283	.596	8.2	1.7	1.1	0.9	2.6	14.1
2015–16	Duke	25	**25**	**31.2**	.535	**.358**	.750	**9.6**	1.6	**1.3**	**2.1**	2.7	**18.9**
2016–17	Connecticut	Did not play (NCAA transfer rules)											
2017–18	Connecticut	**37**	8	20.9	**.606**	.176	**.791**	7.4	**1.9**	0.8	**2.1**	**1.3**	14.7
**Career**		95	58	26.4	.552	.273	.707	8.3	1.7	1.0	1.7	2.1	15.6
