= Shakira Austin =

American basketball player (born 2000)

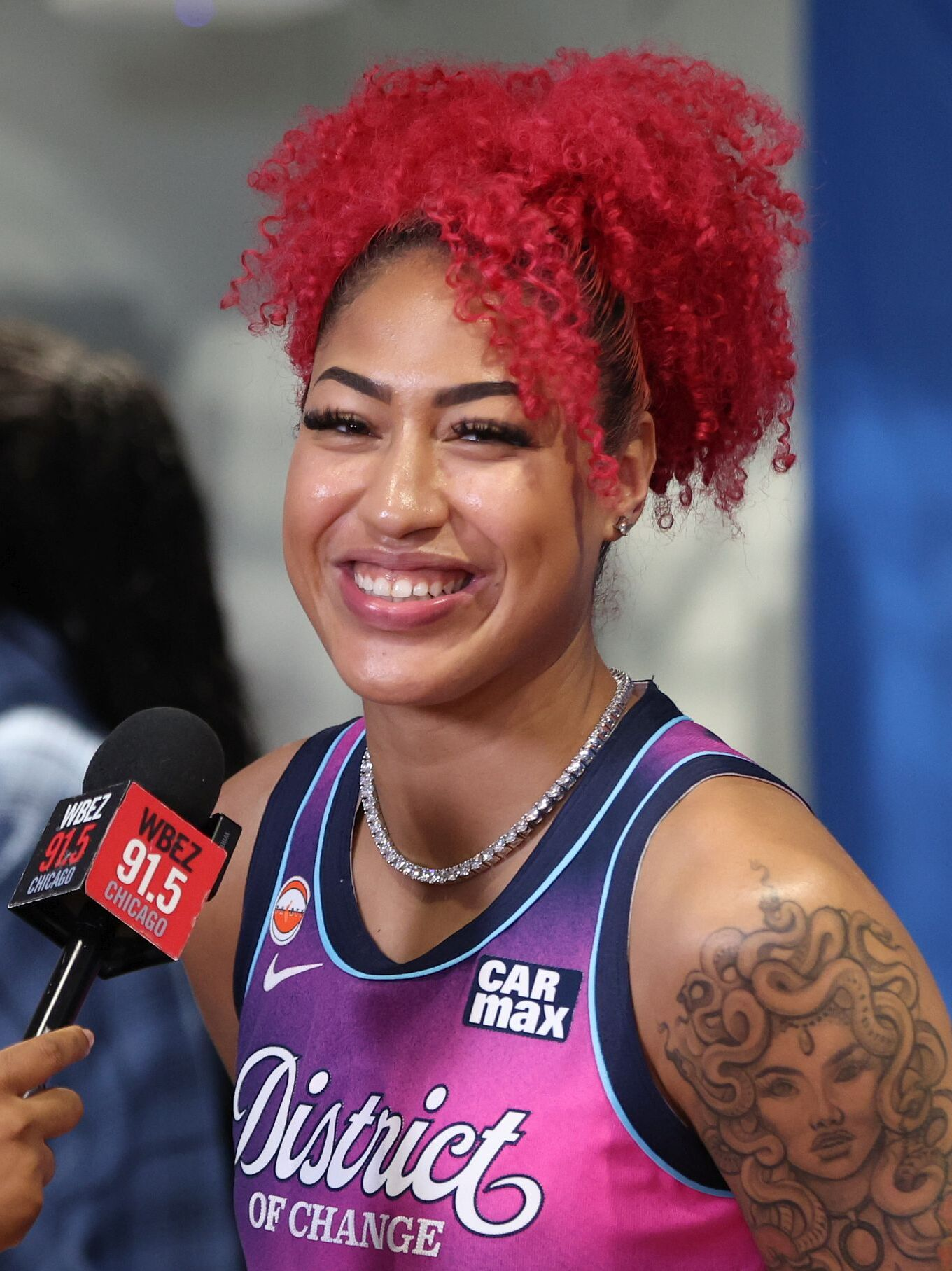
- Austin in 2026

No. 0 – Washington Mystics
- Position: Center
- League: WNBA

Personal information
- Born: July 25, 2000 (age 26) Fredericksburg, Virginia, U.S.
- Listed height: 6 ft 5 in (1.96 m)
- Listed weight: 200 lb (91 kg)

Career information
- High school: Riverdale Baptist School (Upper Marlboro, Maryland)
- College: Maryland (2018–2020); Ole Miss (2020–2022)
- WNBA draft: 2022: 1st round, 3rd overall pick
- Drafted by: Washington Mystics
- Playing career: 2022–present

Career history
- 2022–present: Washington Mystics
- 2022–2023: Elitzur Ramla
- 2025: Lunar Owls BC
- 2026–present: Rose BC

Career highlights
- All-WNBA Second Team (2026); WNBA All-Defensive First Team (2026); Associated Press Comeback Player of the Year (2025); WNBA All-Rookie Team (2022); Israeli champion (2023); Israeli Basketball Premier League MVP (2023); 2× First-team All-SEC (2021, 2022); 2× Gillom Trophy (2021, 2022); Second-team All-Big Ten (2020); Big Ten All-Defensive Team (2019); Big Ten All-Freshman Team (2019); McDonald's All-American (2018)
- Stats at Basketball Reference
Medals
Representing United States
Women's basketball
World Cup
Gold medal – first place	2022 Australia
Women's 3x3 basketball
FIBA 3x3 AmeriCup
Gold medal – first place	2025 León

Shakira Austin (born July 25, 2000) is an American professional basketball player for the Washington Mystics of the Women's National Basketball Association (WNBA) and for the Rose of Unrivaled. She played college basketball at Maryland and Ole Miss.

== College career ==
Austin was rated as the fourth ranked player in the nation in the 2018 recruiting class and the second ranked forward. She was also a 2018 McDonald's High School All-American. Austin signed with Maryland out of high school. Following her first season at Maryland in 2018–19, Austin was selected to the All-Big Ten Freshman Team after a school record 89 blocks. Following Austin's second and final season at Maryland in 2019–20, she was named to the All-Big Ten Second Team. After her sophomore season at Maryland, Austin announced her transfer to Ole Miss.

Austin was awarded the Gillom Trophy in 2021.

== Professional career ==
=== WNBA ===
On April 11, 2022, Austin was drafted third overall by the Washington Mystics in the 2022 WNBA draft. In 2022 she averaged 8.7 points, 6.4 rebounds, and 0.9 assists per game, playing in all 36 games.

In 2023 she suffered a hip injury early in the season and ended up playing in only 19 of 40 games, although bettered her rookie year statistics, with 10.0 points, 7.0 rebounds, and 0.9 assists per game. In the offseason, Austin had surgery to repair a torn hip labrum. She started the 2024 season, but re-injured the hip, missing significant time. Together with a left ankle sprain late in the season, the injuries limited her to playing in only 12 of 40 games in 2024.

=== Overseas ===
In September 2022, Austin signed with the Israeli champions Elitzur Ramla, until the end of the season. She led Ramla to a second consecutive championship win, and was chosen as the league's best player.

=== Unrivaled ===
On September 25, 2024, it was announced that Austin would appear and play in the inaugural season of Unrivaled, the women's 3-on-3 basketball league founded by Napheesa Collier and Breanna Stewart. She played for the Lunar Owls in the 2025 Unrivaled season.

On November 5, 2025, it was announced that Austin had been drafted by Rose BC for the 2026 Unrivaled season.

== National Team Career ==
Austin participated in the 2022 FIBA Women's World Cup with the U.S. national team. The United States would win Gold at the tournament. She was invited to train with the senior team in 2024.

=== 3x3 ===
It was announced on November 4, 2024, that Austin was one of 13 athletes called up to participate in development camp for the U.S. women's national team.

== Career statistics ==
Legend
GP	Games played	GS	Games started	MPG	Minutes per game	RPG	Rebounds per game
APG	Assists per game	SPG	Steals per game	BPG	Blocks per game	PPG	Points per game
TO	Turnovers per game	FG%	Field-goal percentage	3P%	3-point field-goal percentage	FT%	Free-throw percentage
**Bold**	Career best	°	League leader

=== WNBA ===
==== Regular season ====
Stats current through end of 2025 regular season

WNBA regular season statistics
Year	Team	GP	GS	MPG	FG%	3P%	FT%	RPG	APG	SPG	BPG	TO	PPG
2022	Washington	36	**32**	21.6	**.547**	.000	.624	6.5	0.9	0.7	0.8	**1.5**	8.7
2023	Washington	19	17	**23.2**	.500	—	.610	**7.0**	0.9	0.8	0.9	1.8	10.0
2024	Washington	12	11	19.9	.430	**.250**	**.667**	6.8	0.9	**1.3**	0.9	2.4	11.8
2025	Washington	**38**	30	23.0	.465	.133	.664	6.4	**1.8**	1.1	**1.1**	2.4	**12.7**
**Career**	4 years, 1 team	105	90	22.2	.486	.150	.644	6.6	1.2	0.9	1.0	2.0	10.7

==== Playoffs ====
WNBA playoff statistics
Year	Team	GP	GS	MPG	FG%	3P%	FT%	RPG	APG	SPG	BPG	TO	PPG
2022	Washington	2	2	27.0	.462	.000	.500	7.5	1.0	1.0	0.5	2.5	7.0
2023	Washington	Did not play (injury)											
**Career**	1 year, 1 team	2	2	27.0	.462	.000	.500	7.5	1.0	1.0	0.5	2.5	7.0

=== College ===
NCAA statistics
Year	Team	GP	GS	MPG	FG%	3P%	FT%	RPG	APG	SPG	BPG	TO	PPG
2018–19	Maryland	**34**	21	23.5	.432	—	.479	**9.5**	1.1	1.1	**2.6**	**1.7**	8.4
2019–20	Maryland	32	26	23.8	.509	.000	.643	6.8	**1.7**	**1.8**	1.3	2.9	12.0
2020–21	Ole Miss	27	26	**28.9**	**.519**	.176	**.759**	9.1	1.3	1.6	1.8	2.3	**18.6**
2021–22	Ole Miss	32	**32**	27.7	.463	**.235**	.681	9.0	**1.7**	1.2	2.1	2.4	15.2
**Career**		125	105	25.8	.483	.200	.647	8.6	1.4	1.4	2.0	2.5	13.3
