= DiJonai Carrington =

American basketball player (born 1998)

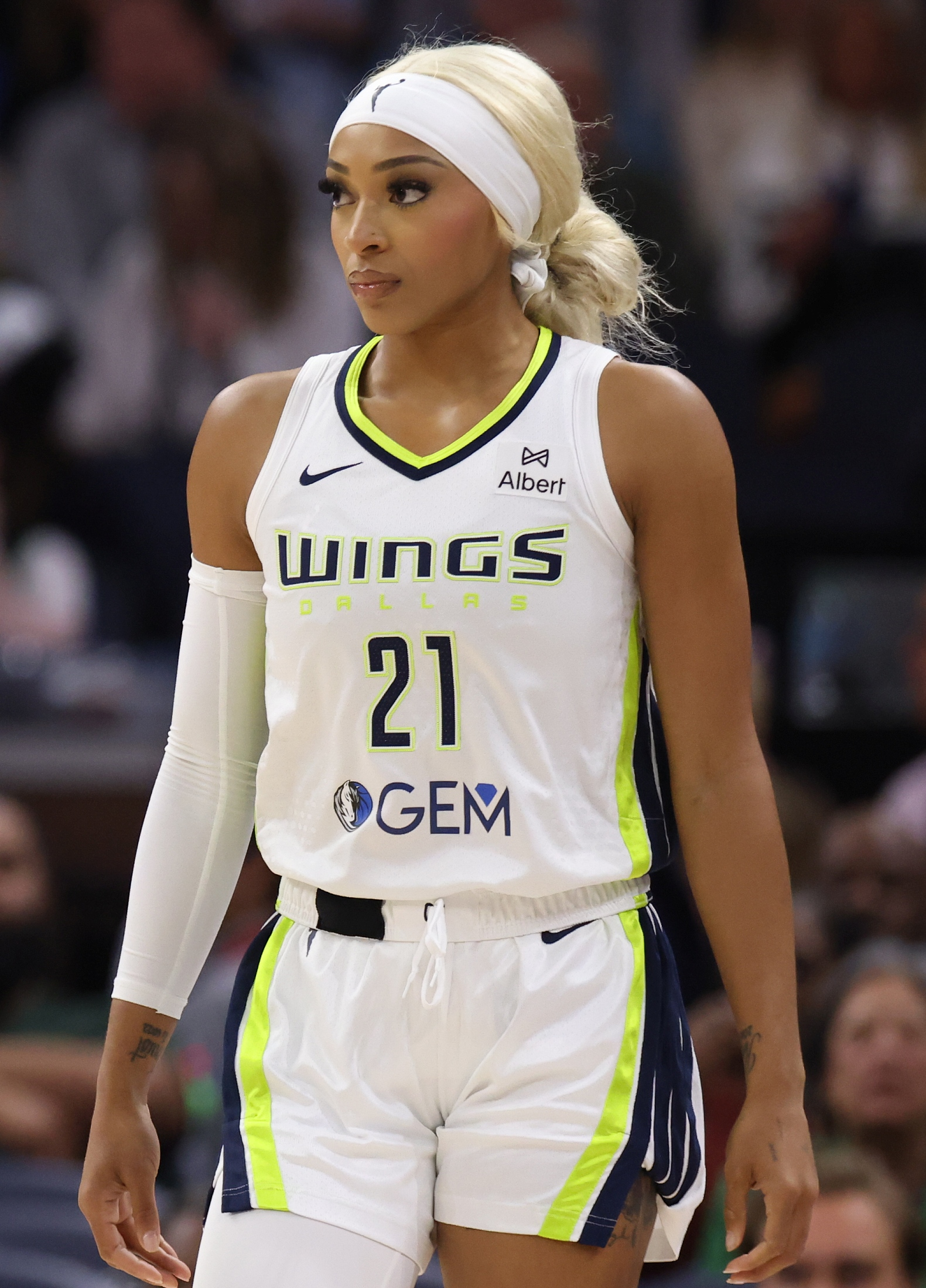
- Carrington with the Dallas Wings in 2025

No. 7 – Chicago Sky
- Position: Shooting guard / forward
- League: WNBA

Personal information
- Born: January 8, 1998 (age 28) San Diego, California, U.S.
- Listed height: 5 ft 11 in (1.80 m)
- Listed weight: 175 lb (79 kg)

Career information
- High school: Horizon Christian (San Diego, California)
- College: Stanford (2016–2020); Baylor (2020–2021)
- WNBA draft: 2021: 2nd round, 20th overall pick
- Drafted by: Connecticut Sun
- Playing career: 2021–present

Career history
- 2021–2024: Connecticut Sun
- 2025: Mist
- 2025: Dallas Wings
- 2025: Minnesota Lynx
- 2026–present: Chicago Sky

Career highlights
- WNBA All-Defensive First Team (2024); WNBA Most Improved Player (2024); Big 12 Sixth Player of the Year (2021); All Pac-12 (2019); McDonald's All-American (2016)
- Stats at Basketball Reference

DiJonai Victoria Carrington (/diːʒoʊˈneɪ/ dee-zhoh-NAY; born January 8, 1998) is an American professional basketball player for the Chicago Sky of the Women's National Basketball Association (WNBA). She played college basketball for Stanford and Baylor before being drafted 20th overall by the Connecticut Sun in the 2021 WNBA draft.

== Early life and education ==
Carrington is the daughter of former NFL player Darren Carrington and Victoria Carrington. Her older brother Darren Carrington II went on to be a wide receiver for the Oregon Ducks. Carrington's undergraduate degrees from Stanford are in psychology, African studies and African-American studies.

Carrington attended Horizon Christian Academy in San Diego, California. She scored over 2,000 career points for Horizon, averaging 18.8 points, 13.5 rebounds, 4.0 assists, and 2.5 steals per game. She was named a McDonald's All-American and a Jordan Brand Classic All-American. Following her outstanding high school career, she committed to play for Stanford.

== College career ==
=== Stanford (2016–2020) ===
Carrington played basketball for four years at Stanford. During her time there, she helped the Cardinal win two Pac-12 tournament championships (2017 and 2019). She also was named to the All Pac-12 Team from both the Coaches and Media in 2019. She was also named to the Academic Honor Roll in 2020 and was named to the Pac-12 All-Academic Honorable Mention team in 2018 and 2019.

=== Baylor (2020–2021) ===
Following her time at Stanford, Carrington grad-transferred to Baylor to compete with the Lady Bears. In her one season there, Carrington averaged 14.1 points and 4.9 rebounds per game. She was named Big-12 Newcomer of the Year and the Sixth Person of the Year.

== Professional career ==
=== WNBA ===
Carrington was the 20th pick by the Connecticut Sun in the 2021 WNBA draft.

==== Connecticut Sun (2021–2024) ====
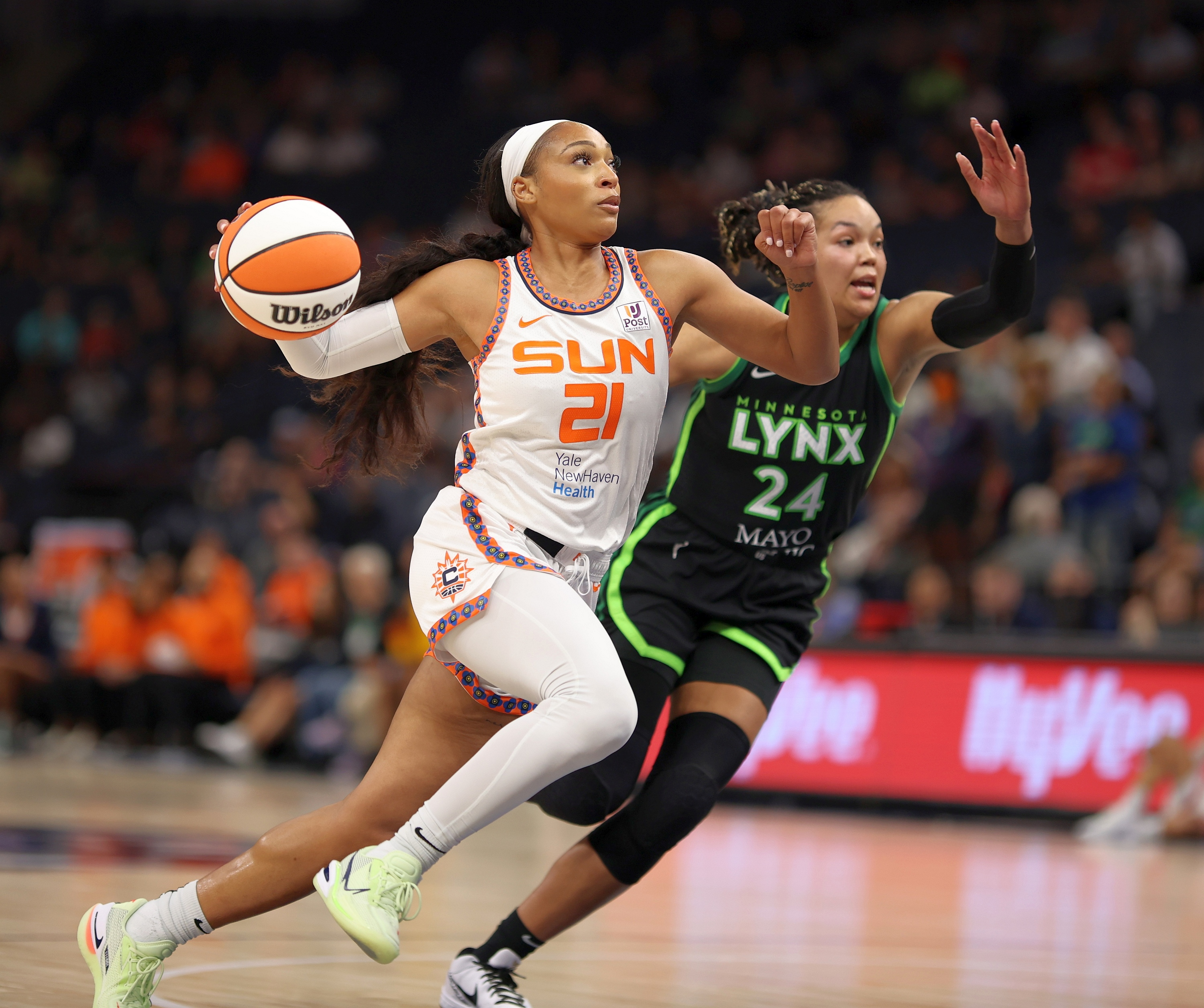
Carrington drives to the basket against Napheesa Collier of the Minnesota Lynx, June 2023.

After attending the Sun training camp, she earned one of the Sun's 11 roster spots. On September 25, 2024, the WNBA announced that Carrington was named the Most Improved Player for 2024. On September 29, 2024, the WNBA announced that Carrington had been named to the 2024 All-Defensive First Team.

==== Dallas and Minnesota (2025) ====
On February 2, 2025, Carrington was traded to the Dallas Wings. The deal was originally reported as Carrington, plus the 12th pick in the 2025 WNBA draft, and swap rights for the Sun's 2026 second-round pick, being traded in exchange for Jacy Sheldon and the 8th overall pick in the 2025 draft; however, it was officially part of a larger four-team trade.

On August 3, Carrington was traded to the Minnesota Lynx for Diamond Miller, Karlie Samuelson, and Minnesota’s 2027 second-round draft pick. Due to a foot injury sustained in September 2025, Carrington was unable to finish the playoff run with the Lynx.

==== Chicago Sky (2026–present) ====
On April 12, 2026, Carrington signed a one year deal with the Chicago Sky. Due to the injury from the prior season, Carrington was unable to play the first 27 games of the season. She returned to play on July 30, 2026, scoring nine points in 17 minutes to assist a Sky win against the Connecticut Sun.

In 2025, she became the second Reebok-endorsed WNBA player after Angel Reese.

=== Unrivaled League ===
On September 4, 2024, it was announced that Carrington would appear and play in the inaugural season of Unrivaled, a new women's 3-on-3 basketball league founded by Napheesa Collier and Breanna Stewart. She played for the Mist in the 2025 season.

Due to a foot injury sustained in the 2025 WNBA Season, Carrington was not able to appear in the 2026 Unrivaled season as planned.

=== Athletes Unlimited ===
In 2022, Carrington competed in the inaugural season of Athletes Unlimited Pro Basketball, where she was one of only two players to score double figures in all fifteen games; she finished 7th on the league leaderboard. She was named in the league's inaugural All-Defensive Team for her performance during the season.

== Career statistics ==
Legend
GP	Games played	GS	Games started	MPG	Minutes per game	RPG	Rebounds per game
APG	Assists per game	SPG	Steals per game	BPG	Blocks per game	PPG	Points per game
TO	Turnovers per game	FG%	Field-goal percentage	3P%	3-point field-goal percentage	FT%	Free-throw percentage
**Bold**	Career best	°	League leader

=== WNBA ===
==== Regular season ====
Stats current through end of 2026 season

WNBA regular season statistics
Year	Team	GP	GS	MPG	FG%	3P%	FT%	RPG	APG	SPG	BPG	TO	PPG
2021	Connecticut	24	1	9.2	.329	.143	.733	2.0	0.5	0.5	0.1	0.9	2.8
2022	Connecticut	36	2	17.5	.414	.306	.750	3.1	1.1	0.8	0.1	1.6	6.8
2023	Connecticut	32	0	17.2	.417	.371	.757	2.9	1.3	0.6	0.1	1.1	8.3
2024	Connecticut	**39**	**39**	**29.6**	.403	.250	.790	5.0	1.6	**1.6**	0.4	1.9	**12.7**
2025	Dallas	20	13	24.9	.354	.260	**.825**	**5.1**	**1.8**	1.1	**0.5**	2.5	10.4
2025	Minnesota	11	1	16.6	**.485**	**.455**	.760	2.1	1.1	1.2	0.4	0.9	8.6
2026	Chicago	11	0	16.2	.330	.280	.737	3.1	0.6	0.6	0.2	**0.8**	8.8
**Career**	6 years, 4 teams	173	56	19.7	.394	.292	.774	3.5	1.2	0.9	0.2	1.5	8.5

==== Playoffs ====
WNBA playoff statistics
Year	Team	GP	GS	MPG	FG%	3P%	FT%	RPG	APG	SPG	BPG	TO	PPG
2021	Connecticut	2	0	0.5	—	—	—	0.0	0.0	0.0	0.0	**0.0**	0.0
2022	Connecticut	**12**	0	14.6	.450	.231	.700	2.7	0.8	1.0	0.2	1.3	5.9
2023	Connecticut	6	0	13.7	.464	.250	.600	2.3	0.5	0.7	0.0	1.3	5.0
2024	Connecticut	7	**7**	**33.6**	.439	.231	**.778**	**6.1**	**2.0**	**1.7**	**0.6**	1.7	**13.7**
2025	Minnesota	2	0	12.5	**.500**	**.571**	.500	1.0	1.0	0.5	0.5	0.5	8.5
**Career**	5 years, 2 teams	29	7	17.9	.451	.297	.722	3.1	1.0	1.0	0.2	1.2	7.4

=== College ===
Ratios
Year	Team	GP	FG%	3P%	FT%	RBG	APG	BPG	SPG	PPG
2016-17	Stanford	35	44.3%	23.8%	57.9%	2.29	0.40	0.09	0.54	2.46
2017-18	Stanford	32	40.1%	28.0%	68.4%	5.56	1.81	0.22	1.44	8.84
2018-19	Stanford	**36**	45.3%	**33.0%**	68.8%	**7.47**	1.56	0.39	1.11	14.03
2019-20	Stanford	5	**48.6%**	28.6%	40.0%	5.20	1.00	**0.60**	0.20	7.60
2020-21	Baylor	27	42.6%	28.5%	**72.3%**	4.89	**2.33**	0.56	**2.07**	**14.15**
Career		135	43.3%	29.4%	68.7%	5.07	1.45	0.31	1.20	9.59

Totals
Year	Team	GP	FG	FGA	3P	3PA	FT	FTA	REB	A	BK	ST	PTS
2016-17	Stanford	35	35	79	5	21	11	19	80	14	3	19	86
2017-18	Stanford	32	107	267	30	107	39	57	178	58	7	46	283
2018-19	Stanford	**36**	**180**	**397**	37	112	**108**	**157**	**269**	56	14	40	**505**
2019-20	Stanford	5	17	35	2	7	2	5	26	5	3	1	38
2020-21	Baylor	27	135	317	**39**	**137**	73	101	132	**63**	**15**	**56**	382
Career		135	474	1095	113	384	233	339	685	196	42	162	1294

== Personal life ==
Carrington dated another professional basketball player, NaLyssa Smith, starting when they were teammates at Baylor. In March 2025, while appearing on Angel Reese's podcast, Unapologetically Angel, when asked if she had always dated women, Carrington said, "No, I'm not even like into girls," and later stated that "I’m not gay, I just like Lyss." The two split up later that year.

In 2026, Carrington was at the center of public commentary about the flagrant 2 foul she committed on Sophie Cunningham, and the events immediately surrounding it: Following the ejection Carrington posted "WHITE PRIVILEGE" on social media and tagged the Fever. Carrington later posted that "I've never once claimed that the assessment of the foul was white privilege" and told a reporter "I would just love consistency across the board when it comes to things like that. Whether it's the foul that I commit, whether it's the reaction or retaliation, I would just love for it to be consistent across the board, regardless of the name on your jersey or your skin color or the score of the game."
