= Nola Henry =

American basketball coach (born 1994)

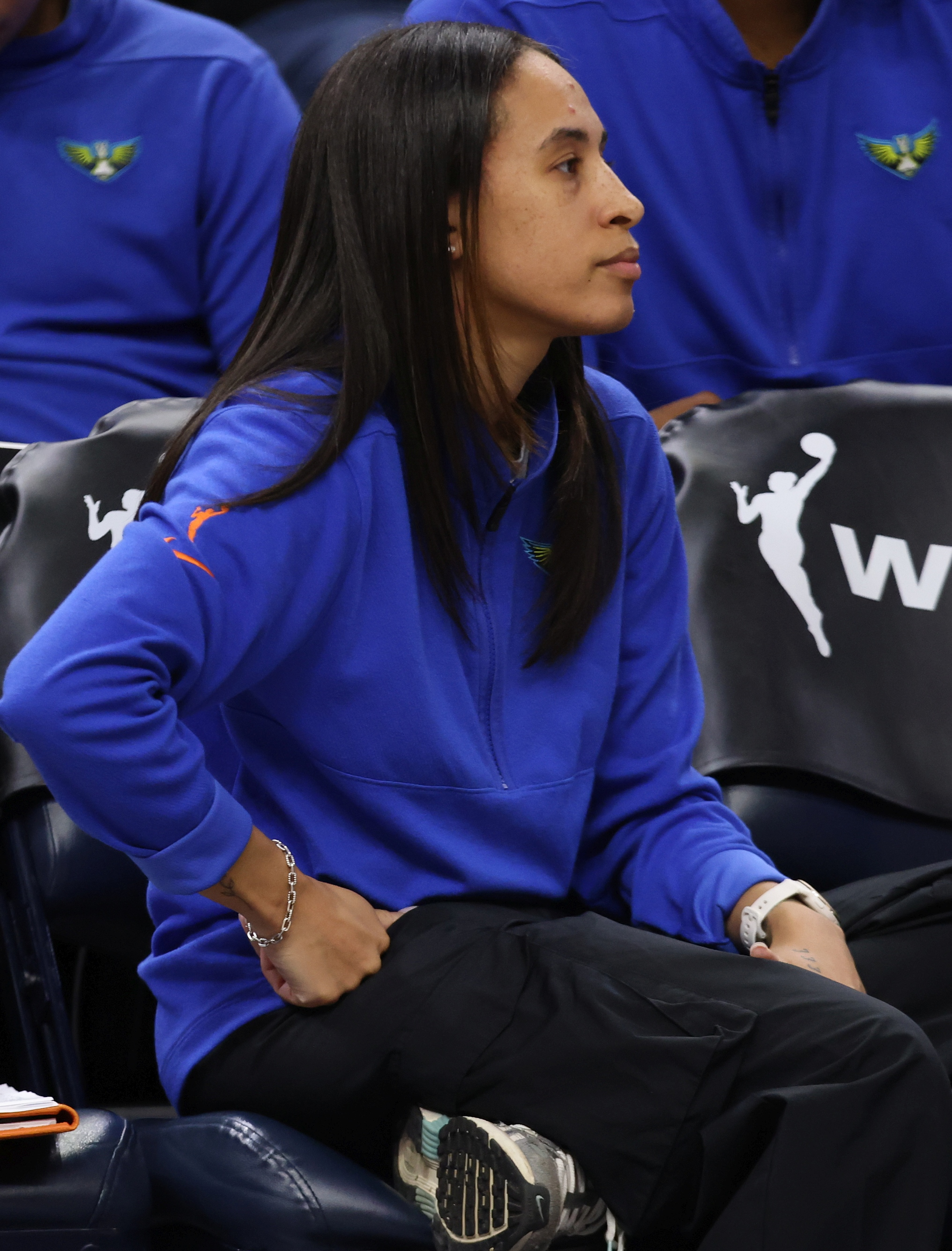
- Henry with the Dallas Wings in 2025

Las Vegas Aces
- Title: Assistant coach
- League: WNBA

Personal information
- Born: June 7, 1994 (age 32) Willingboro Township, New Jersey, U.S.
- Listed height: 5 ft 7 in (1.70 m)

Career information
- High school: Willingboro High School (Willingboro Township, New Jersey); Trenton Catholic Academy (Hamilton, New Jersey)
- College: UMass (2012–2014); Charleston (2015–2017)
- Position: Guard
- Coaching career: 2018–present

Career history

Coaching
- 2018–2019: Fairleigh Dickinson (graduate assistant)
- 2019–2020: Hartford (graduate assistant)
- 2020: Connecticut Sun (intern)
- 2021–2022: Connecticut Sun (assistant basketball operations manager)
- 2023: Los Angeles Sparks (player development)
- 2024: Los Angeles Sparks (assistant)
- 2025–present: Rose BC
- 2025: Dallas Wings (assistant)
- 2026–present: Las Vegas Aces (assistant)

Nola Henry (born June 7, 1994) is an American professional basketball coach, currently serving as an assistant coach for the Las Vegas Aces of the Women's National Basketball Association (WNBA) and the head coach for Rose BC of the Unrivaled basketball league. She played college basketball for the UMass Minutewomen and Charleston Cougars. She began her coaching career as a graduate assistant at Fairleigh Dickinson and later Hartford. In the WNBA, she held various roles under coach and executive Curt Miller in the Connecticut Sun, Los Angeles Sparks, and the Dallas Wings. In 2024, she was named one of the Unrivaled coaches and led Rose BC to a championship in the league's 2025 inaugural season.

== Coaching career ==
=== College ===
Henry started her coaching career in 2018 as a graduate assistant at Fairleigh Dickinson.

In 2019–2020, Henry served as a graduate assistant at Hartford.

=== WNBA ===
Henry began her WNBA career as an intern with the Connecticut Sun in 2020, before serving as an assistant basketball operations manager under head coach Curt Miller from 2021 to 2022.

Henry followed Miller to the Los Angeles Sparks, working as a player development coach in 2023 before being promoted to assistant coach in 2024. She served as the interim head coach for the May 30, 2024, game against the Chicago Sky.

After the 2024 season, Henry once again followed Miller, who was dismissed from the Sparks and became the general manager of the Dallas Wings. In January 2025, she was named an assistant coach for the Wings under head coach Chris Koclanes and served in the role for one season before Koclanes' dismissal.

Henry joined the Aces' coaching staff ahead of the 2026 season in an assistant role.

=== Unrivaled ===
In November 2024, Henry was announced as one of the coaches of the Unrivaled basketball league. She was named head coach of Rose BC. She led Rose to a championship in the league's inaugural season.
