= Rose BC =

Rose BBC
- Nickname: Rosebuds
- League: Unrivaled
- Founded: 2025
- History: Rose BC; 2025–present
- Arena: Wayfair Arena
- Location: Miami, Florida
- Team colors
- Head coach: Nola Henry (2025–present)
- Team captain: Chelsea Gray (2025) Kahleah Copper (2026)
- Ownership: Unrivaled
- Championships: 1 (2025)
- Website: Website

Rose Basketball Club, also known as Rose BC, is an American professional basketball team. They are a member of the Unrivaled basketball league, and made their debut in January 2025. The teams are based in Miami, Florida. Rose is led by coach Nola Henry.

== History ==
On October 24, 2024, the Unrivaled basketball league announced the names and logos of six teams joining its league: Laces BC, Lunar Owls BC, Mist BC, Phantom BC, Rose BC, and Vinyl BC. Rose BC, along with the other five teams, are based in Miami, Florida for the inaugural 2025 season. Six head coaches were later hired on November 15.

On March 17, 2025, Rose BC won Unrivaled's first league Championship against Vinyl BC, with Chelsea Gray named as Finals MVP.

On September 10, 2025, Unrivaled announced they were adding two new teams to the league, Breeze BC and Hive BC.

== Roster ==
=== 2025 season ===
On November 20, 2024, the six head coaches collaborated on balancing and choosing the rosters for the six teams. Rose BC's roster was finalized with Chelsea Gray, Kahleah Copper, Angel Reese, Brittney Sykes, Azurá Stevens, and Lexie Hull as its players.

In February 2025, Ariel Atkins was signed to Rose on a relief player contract after Copper and Stevens suffered injuries.

2025 Rose BC roster
Players
Chelsea Gray	Kahleah Copper	Angel Reese	Brittney Sykes	Azurá Stevens	Lexie Hull

=== 2026 season ===
On February 9, Azurá Stevens was traded to Hive. On February 11, it was announced that Angel Reese would be rejoining Rose.

2026 Rose BC roster
Players
Shakira Austin	Lexie Hull	Sug Sutton	Angel Reese	Chelsea Gray	Kahleah Copper

=== 2027 season ===
2027 Rose BC roster
Players
Brittney Sykes	Chelsea Gray	Kayla Thornton	Lexie Hull	Shakira Austin	Aziaha James

== 2025 schedule ==
=== Regular season ===
2025 Rose BC
Total: 8–6 (home: 4–3; road: 4–3)
January: 1–4 (home: 0–2; road: 1–2)

Game	Date	Team	Score	High points	High rebounds	High assists	Location	Record
1	January 17	Vinyl BC	L 73–79	Kahleah Copper (24)	Angel Reese (14)	Chelsea Gray (6)	Wayfair Arena	0–1
2	January 18	@ Lunar Owls BC	L 70–79	Azurá Stevens (17)	Kahleah Copper (7)	Chelsea Gray (6)	Wayfair Arena	0–2
3	January 25	@ Mist BC	W 71–66	Lexie Hull (19)	Gray & Stevens (7)	Chelsea Gray (6)	Wayfair Arena	1–2
4	January 27	Laces BC	L 64–71	Brittney Sykes (18)	Angel Reese (7)	Chelsea Gray (5)	Wayfair Arena	1–3
5	January 31	@ Phantom BC	L 63–75	Azurá Stevens (19)	Kahleah Copper (9)	Chelsea Gray (6)	Wayfair Arena	1–4

February: 5–0 (home: 3–0; road: 2–0)

Game	Date	Team	Score	High points	High rebounds	High assists	Location	Record
6	February 1	Laces BC	W 83–69	Chelsea Gray (28)	Angel Reese (15)	Chelsea Gray (8)	Wayfair Arena	2–4
7	February 7	@ Mist BC	W 71–63	Kahleah Copper (21)	Angel Reese (12)	Chelsea Gray (7)	Wayfair Arena	3–4
8	February 18	@ Vinyl BC	W 61–55	Chelsea Gray (26)	Angel Reese (15)	Azurá Stevens (3)	Wayfair Arena	4–4
9	February 21	Lunar Owls BC	W 72–63	Chelsea Gray (26)	Angel Reese (21)	Chelsea Gray (5)	Wayfair Arena	5–4
10	February 24	Phantom BC	W 7-59	Chelsea Gray (26)	Angel Reese (14)	Chelsea Gray (7)	Wayfair Arena	6-4

March: 2–2 (home: 1–1; road: 1–1)

Game	Date	Team	Score	High points	High rebounds	High assists	Location	Record
11	March 1	Mist BC	L 62-71	Chelsea Gray (38)	Angel Reese (13)	Gray & Atkins (2)	Wayfair Arena	6-5
12	March 3	@ Laces BC	W 58-53	Chelsea Gray (26)	Angel Reese (17)	Chelsea Gray (7)	Wayfair Arena	7-5
13	March 7	@ Lunar Owls BC	L 56-66	Sykes & Reese (17)	Reese (10)	Gray (5)	Wayfair Arena	7-6
14	March 10	Vinyl BC	W 74-46	Chelsea Gray (33)	Angel Reese (13)	Brittney Sykes (5)	Wayfair Arena	8-6

== 2025 ==
In their ninth game of the season, Rose won against the only previously undefeated team, Lunar Owls. In this game, Angel Reese was the first player in Unrivaled history to achieve a 20-20 game, with 22 points and 21 rebounds.

Chelsea Gray was voted to the First Team, leading Unrivaled in game-winning shots with six. She scored her seventh game winner in the semifinals, finishing with 39 points, the most by one player in any game. Angel Reese was voted to the Second Team, leading the league in rebounds and being one of four players to average a double double.

Angel Reese earned Defensive Player of the Year. She led the team in blocks and played a key role in the league's best scoring defense.

Rose won the first ever Unrivaled championship. Brittney Sykes led the team in scoring with 21 points, achieving her season high, and the game winning basket. Chelsea Gray was named Finals MVP.

== 2026 ==
On tour in Philadelphia on January 30, the game against Lunar Owls broke the all-time attendance record for a professional women's basketball game, with an audience of 21,490.

In the win against Laces during the race for remaining playoff spots, Chelsea Gray tied Marina Mabrey's record of 10 three-pointers made in a game. Gray topped the league in assists, averaging 6.1 per game. She was named League MVP.

== Honors and awards ==
- All-Unrivaled First Team: Chelsea Gray (2025, 2026)
- All-Unrivaled Second Team: Angel Reese (2025)
- League MVP: Chelsea Gray (2026)
- Finals MVP: Chelsea Gray (2025)
- Defensive Player of the Year: Angel Reese (2025)
