= Laces BC =

- Nickname: Soulmates
- League: Unrivaled
- Founded: 2025
- History: Laces BC; 2025–present
- Arena: Wayfair Arena
- Location: Miami, Florida
- Team colors
- Head coach: Andrew Wade
- Team captain: Alyssa Thomas (2025) Jackie Young (2026)
- Ownership: Unrivaled
- Website: Laces BC

Laces Basketball Club, also known as Laces BC, is an American professional basketball team. They are a member of the Unrivaled basketball league, and made their debut in January 2025. The teams are based in Miami, Florida, and the Laces are led by coach Andrew Wade.

== History ==
On October 24, 2024, the Unrivaled basketball league announced the names and logos of six teams joining its league, which are Laces BC, Lunar Owls BC, Mist BC, Phantom BC, Rose BC, and Vinyl BC. Laces BC, along with the other five teams, were based in Miami, Florida for the inaugural 2025 season. Alex Bazzell, the president of Unrivaled, confirmed the league owns all six teams. The six inaugural head coaches were later hired on November 15.

On September 10, 2025, Unrivaled announced they were adding two new teams to the league, Breeze BC and Hive BC.

== Roster ==
=== 2025 season ===
On November 20, 2024, the six head coaches collaborated on balancing and choosing the rosters for the six teams. After the selection show, the Laces BC's roster was decided with Kelsey Plum, Kayla McBride, Kate Martin, Alyssa Thomas, Courtney Williams and Stefanie Dolson as its players.

In late November 2024, Kelsey Plum announced via social media that she would no longer be playing in the 2025 season and instead would "take some more time for myself this offseason," leaving the Laces with a wildcard spot. On December 21, 2024, Laces BC traded Courtney Williams to Lunar Owls BC for Natasha Cloud. Laces BC then traded Cloud and their wildcard pick to Phantom BC in exchange for Jackie Young and Tiffany Hayes.

2025 Laces BC roster
Players
Jackie Young	Tiffany Hayes	Kayla McBride	Kate Martin	Alyssa Thomas	Stefanie Dolson

==== Relief players ====
Natisha Hiedeman was reassigned to the Laces as a relief player on January 27 due to both Alyssa Thomas and Jackie Young being unavailable for their game that same day against Rose BC.

On February 8, 2025, the Laces signed Kiki Jefferson to a relief player contract for their game against Vinyl BC that same day. However, the game was canceled "to prioritize player health and safety."

On February 18, the Laces also signed Betnijah Laney-Hamilton as a relief player. After appearing in just two games, Laney-Hamilton exited the league on March 3 due to an undisclosed injury.

=== 2026 season ===
2026 Laces BC roster
Players
Jackie Young	Alyssa Thomas	Naz Hillmon	Maddy Siegrist	Jordin Canada	Brittney Sykes

=== 2027 season ===
2027 Laces BC roster
Players
Jackie Young	Satou Sabally	Maddy Siegrist	Marine Johannès	Gabby Williams	Jessica Shepard

== 2025 schedule ==
=== Regular season ===
2025 regular season game log
Total: 7–7 (home: 4–3; road: 3–4)
January: 4–1 (home: 2–1; road: 2–0)

Game	Date	Team	Score	High points	High rebounds	High assists	Location	Record
1	January 18	@ Phantom BC	W 86–48	Kayla McBride (28)	Kate Martin (10)	Tiffany Hayes (10)	Wayfair Arena	1–0
2	January 20	Mist BC	W 63–43	Kayla McBride (21)	Alyssa Thomas (15)	Alyssa Thomas (4)	Wayfair Arena	2–0
3	January 24	Vinyl BC	W 83–79	Tiffany Hayes (26)	Alyssa Thomas (12)	Alyssa Thomas (4)	Wayfair Arena	3–0
4	January 27	@ Rose BC	W 71–64	Kayla McBride (31)	Tiffany Hayes (11)	Stefanie Dolson (4)	Wayfair Arena	4–0
5	January 31	Lunar Owls BC	L 73–75	Kayla McBride (26)	Kayla McBride (8)	Tiffany Hayes (5)	Wayfair Arena	4–1

February: 1–5 (home: 1–1; road: 0–4)

Game	Date	Team	Score	High points	High rebounds	High assists	Location	Record
6	February 1	@ Rose BC	L 69–83	Kayla McBride (20)	Martin & McBride (6)	Jackie Young (3)	Wayfair Arena	4–2
7	February 8	@ Vinyl BC	F 0–11	Game canceled - Laces forfeit				4–3
8	February 18	Phantom BC	W 75–68	Kayla McBride (30)	Stefanie Dolson (8)	Hiedeman & McBride (4)	Wayfair Arena	5–3
9	February 22	@ Lunar Owls BC	L 60–88	Kayla McBride (18)	Kayla McBride (7)	Natisha Hiedeman (3)	Wayfair Arena	5–4
10	February 24	@ Mist BC	L 49–65	Kayla McBride (19)	Alyssa Thomas (8)	Alyssa Thomas (5)	Wayfair Arena	5–5
11	February 28	Vinyl BC	L 63–64	Thomas & Young (16)	Alyssa Thomas (9)	Jackie Young (4)	Wayfair Arena	5–6

March: 2–1 (home: 1–1; road: 1–0)

Game	Date	Team	Score	High points	High rebounds	High assists	Location	Record
12	March 3	Rose BC	L 53–58	Kayla McBride (20)	Alyssa Thomas (16)	Alyssa Thomas (8)	Wayfair Arena	5–7
13	March 7	@ Phantom BC	W 73–59	Kayla McBride (25)	Alyssa Thomas (12)	Kayla McBride (5)	Wayfair Arena	6–7
14	March 8	Mist BC	W 76–69	Jackie Young (27)	Alyssa Thomas (12)	Alyssa Thomas (6)	Wayfair Arena	7–7

=== Playoffs ===
2025 playoff game log
Semifinals vs. Rose BC

Game	Date	Team	Score	High points	High rebounds	High assists	Location	Record
1	March 16	@ Rose BC					Wayfair Arena	

== 2025 ==
Kayla McBride was named to the All-Unrivaled First Team.

== Honors and awards ==
- All-Unrivaled First Team: Kayla McBride (2025)
- All-Unrivaled Second Team: Brittney Sykes (2026)
