= Mist BC =

- Nickname: Misties
- League: Unrivaled
- Founded: 2025
- History: Mist BC; 2025–present
- Arena: Wayfair Arena
- Location: Miami, Florida
- Team colors
- Main sponsor: Vistaprint
- Head coach: Phil Handy (2025); Zach O'Brien (2026–present)
- Team captain: Breanna Stewart (2025–present)
- Ownership: Unrivaled
- Championships: 1 (2026)
- Website: Website

Mist Basketball Club, also known as Mist BC, is an American professional basketball team. They are a member of the Unrivaled basketball league, and made their debut in January 2025. The teams are based in Miami, Florida. Zach O'Brien is the Mist head coach.

== History ==
On October 24, 2024, the Unrivaled basketball league announced the names and logos of six teams joining its league, which are Laces BC, Lunar Owls BC, Mist BC, Phantom BC, Rose BC, and Vinyl BC. Mist BC, along with the other five teams, were based in Miami, Florida for the inaugural 2025 season, before the teams began travelling more frequently during the 2026 season. Six head coaches were later hired on November 15.

On September 10, 2025, Unrivaled announced they were adding two new teams to the league, Breeze BC and Hive BC.

== Roster ==
=== 2025 season ===
On November 20, 2024, the six head coaches collaborated on balancing and choosing the rosters for the six teams. Mist BC's roster was finalized with Breanna Stewart, Jewell Loyd, Rickea Jackson, DiJonai Carrington, Courtney Vandersloot, and Aaliyah Edwards as its players.

In January, Mist BC signed NaLyssa Smith to a relief player contract due to Carrington and Loyd being unavailable for their January 24 game versus Phantom.

2025 Mist BC roster
Players
Breanna Stewart	Jewell Loyd	Rickea Jackson	DiJonai Carrington	Courtney Vandersloot	Aaliyah Edwards

=== 2026 season ===
2026 Mist BC roster
Players
Breanna Stewart	Arike Ogunbowale	Veronica Burton	Alanna Smith	Li Yueru	Allisha Gray

=== 2027 season ===
2027 Mist BC roster
Players
Breanna Stewart	Arike Ogunbowale	Veronica Burton	Bridget Carleton	Kiki Rice	Isabelle Harrison

== 2025 schedule ==
=== Regular season ===
2025 Mist BC
Total: 5–9 (home: 3–4; road: 2–5)
January: 0–4 (home: 0–2; road: 0–2)

Game	Date	Team	Score	High points	High rebounds	High assists	Location	Record
1	January 17	Lunar Owls BC	L 80–84	Jewell Loyd (30)	Breanna Stewart (14)	Carrington & Edwards (3)	Wayfair Arena	0–1
2	January 20	@ Laces BC	L 43–63	Breanna Stewart (17)	Breanna Stewart (13)	Breanna Stewart (3)	Wayfair Arena	0–2
3	January 24	@ Phantom BC	L 69–74	Breanna Stewart (27)	Breanna Stewart (11)	Courtney Vandersloot (4)	Wayfair Arena	0–3
4	January 25	Rose BC	L 66–71	Breanna Stewart (20)	Breanna Stewart (9)	Jewell Loyd (7)	Wayfair Arena	0–4

February: 4–3 (home: 3–1; road: 1–2)

Game	Date	Team	Score	High points	High rebounds	High assists	Location	Record
5	February 1	Vinyl BC	W 77–67	Breanna Stewart (23)	Breanna Stewart (10)	Courtney Vandersloot (9)	Wayfair Arena	1–4
6	February 3	Phantom BC	W 64–61	Breanna Stewart (19)	Breanna Stewart (13)	Breanna Stewart (4)	Wayfair Arena	2–4
7	February 7	Rose BC	L 63–71	Rickea Jackson (17)	DiJonai Carrington (8)	Jewell Loyd (3)	Wayfair Arena	2–5
8	February 8	@ Lunar Owls BC	L 81–85	Breanna Stewart (23)	Breanna Stewart (17)	Loyd & Vandersloot (5)	Wayfair Arena	2–6
9	February 21	@ Vinyl BC	L 65–72	Courtney Vandersloot (21)	Breanna Stewart (13)	Jewell Loyd (5)	Wayfair Arena	2–7
10	February 24	Laces BC	W 65-49	Breanna Stewart (21)	Breanna Stewart (12)	Stewart & Vandersloot (4)	Wayfair Arena	3-7
11	February 28	@ Phantom BC	W 88-62	Breanna Stewart (21)	Breanna Stewart (8)	Breanna Stewart (9)	Wayfair Arena	4-7

March: 1–2 (home: 0–1; road: 1–1)

Game	Date	Team	Score	High points	High rebounds	High assists	Location	Record
12	March 1	@ Rose BC	W 71-62	Breanna Stewart (22)	Aaliyah Edwards (10)	Breanna Stewart (5)	Wayfair Arena	5-7
13	March 8	@ Laces BC	L 69-76	Breanna Stewart (24)	Breanna Stewart (13)	Jackson & Carrington (3)	Wayfair Arena	5-8
14	March 10	Lunar Owls BC	L 58-92	Rickea Jackson (22)	Breanna Stewart (10)	Courtney Vandersloot (4)	Wayfair Arena	5-9

== 2025 ==
Breanna Stewart scored the first basket in Unrivaled history.

== 2026 ==
Mist broke the record for most points in a game with 95 against Breeze on February 23. Mist became the first club to score 90 or more points in three games in a row.

Veronica Burton averaged the most steals in the league at 2.1 per game.

Mist won the championship by defeating Phantom. Breanna Stewart won MVP of the finals, scoring 32 points, three rebounds, five assists, two steals, two blocks, and the game-winning shot.

== Honors and awards ==
- Free Throw Challenge: Allisha Gray (2026)
- All-Unrivaled Second Team: Allisha Gray (2026)
- Finals MVP: Breanna Stewart (2026)
