= Phantom BC =

- Nickname: "Ghost Gang"
- League: Unrivaled
- Founded: 2025
- History: Phantom BC; 2025–present
- Arena: Wayfair Arena
- Location: Miami, Florida
- Team colors
- Head coach: Adam Harrington (2025); Roneeka Hodges (2026–present)
- Team captain: Satou Sabally (2025) Kelsey Plum (2026)
- Ownership: Unrivaled
- Website: Website

Phantom Basketball Club, also known as Phantom BC, is an American three-on-three professional basketball team. They are a member of the Unrivaled basketball league, and made their debut in January 2025. The teams are based in Miami, Florida, and Phantom is led by coach Roneeka Hodges.

== History ==
On October 24, 2024, the Unrivaled basketball league announced the names and logos of six teams joining its league, which are Laces BC, Lunar Owls BC, Mist BC, Phantom BC, Rose BC, and Vinyl BC. Phantom BC, along with the other five teams, are based in Miami, Florida for the inaugural 2025 season. Six head coaches were later hired on November 15.

On September 10, 2025, Unrivaled announced they were adding two new teams to the league, Breeze BC and Hive BC.

== Roster ==
=== 2025 season ===
On November 20, 2024, the six head coaches collaborated on balancing and choosing the rosters for the six teams. Phantom BC's roster was finalized with Marina Mabrey, Satou Sabally, Natasha Cloud, Brittney Griner, Katie Lou Samuelson, and Sabrina Ionescu as its players.

=== Relief players ===
In pre-season training, Marina Mabrey sustained a right calf injury requiring a minimum of two weeks rest. In response, Phantom signed Natisha Hiedeman to a relief player contract on January 17. Hiedeman was reassigned to the Laces on January 27. She rejoined Phantom on March 3 after Sabrina Ionescu's exit from the league due to Ionescu's previously planned Asia tour with Nike.

2025 Phantom BC roster
Players
Marina Mabrey	Satou Sabally	Natasha Cloud	Brittney Griner	Katie Lou Samuelson	Sabrina Ionescu

=== 2026 season ===
2026 Phantom BC roster
Players
Satou Sabally	Natasha Cloud	Dana Evans	Aliyah Boston	Kiki Iriafen	Kelsey Plum

=== 2027 season ===
2027 Phantom BC roster
Players
Kelsey Plum	Kayla McBride	Natasha Cloud	Aaliyah Edwards	Tiffany Hayes	Li Yueru

== 2025 schedule ==
=== Regular season ===
2025 Phantom BC
Total: 4–10 (home: 3–4; road: 1–6)
January: 2–3 (home: 2–1; road: 0–2)

Game	Date	Team	Score	High points	High rebounds	High assists	Location	Record
1	January 18	Laces BC	L 48–86	Sabrina Ionescu (18)	Satou Sabally (7)	Tied – 4 players (2)	Wayfair Arena	0–1
2	January 20	@ Vinyl BC	L 69–84	Sabrina Ionescu (14)	Sabrina Ionescu (7)	Sabrina Ionescu (6)	Wayfair Arena	0–2
3	January 24	Mist BC	W 74–69	Griner & Sabally (29)	Brittney Griner (9)	Natasha Cloud (9)	Wayfair Arena	1–2
4	January 25	@ Lunar Owls BC	L 58–82	Satou Sabally (19)	Satou Sabally (9)	Natasha Cloud (6)	Wayfair Arena	1–3
5	January 31	Rose BC	W 75–63	Sabrina Ionescu (32)	Sabrina Ionescu (9)	Sabrina Ionescu (8)	Wayfair Arena	2–3

February: 1–5 (home: 1–2; road: 0–3)

Game	Date	Team	Score	High points	High rebounds	High assists	Location	Record
6	February 3	@ Mist BC	L 61–64	Satou Sabally (22)	Cloud & Griner (8)	Sabrina Ionescu (9)	Wayfair Arena	2–4
7	February 7	Lunar Owls BC	L 76–94	Brittney Griner (23)	Satou Sabally (7)	Natasha Cloud (8)	Wayfair Arena	2–5
8	February 18	@ Laces BC	L 68–75	Sabrina Ionescu (16)	Sabrina Ionescu (13)	Natasha Cloud (8)	Wayfair Arena	2–6
9	February 22	Vinyl BC	W 79-72	Ionescu & Griner (22)	Sabrina Ionescu (9)	Sabally & Cloud (4)	Wayfair Arena	3-6
10	February 24	@ Rose BC	L 59-71	Satou Sabally (17)	Natasha Cloud (6)	Natasha Cloud (5)	Wayfair Arena	3-7
11	February 28	Mist BC	L 62-88	Brittney Griner (24)	Sabrina Ionescu (8)	Ionescu & Cloud (4)	Wayfair Arena	3-8

March: 1–2 (home: 0–1; road: 1–1)

Game	Date	Team	Score	High points	High rebounds	High assists	Location	Record
12	March 3	@ Lunar Owls BC	L 79-92	Satou Sabally (21)	Sabally & Griner (7)	Brittney Griner (7)	Wayfair Arena	3-9
13	March 7	Laces BC	L 59-73	Griner & Cloud (13)	Griner (6)	Tied - 3 players (2)	Wayfair Arena	3-10
14	March 8	@ Vinyl BC	W 80-74	Marina Mabrey (26)	Sabally & Griner (7)	Tied - 3 players (4)	Wayfair Arena	4-10

== 2025 ==
On March 3rd, Brittney Griner recorded the first dunk in Unrivaled history in Phantom's game against Lunar Owls.

== 2026 ==
On January 10, Kelsey Plum tied the league record for most points scored in a game, previously set by Napheesa Collier at 38 in the regular season. Plum later set the record for most points in a playoff game, with 40 in the final. Plum had the most game winners at five in the regular season and another one in the playoffs.

While touring in Philadelphia on January 30, the game against Breeze had the biggest crowd ever for a professional women's basketball game, with 21,490 in attendance.

Aliyah Boston was named Defensive Player of the Year. She led the league in blocks per game with 2.1 and total blocks with 29.

== Honors and awards ==
- All-Unrivaled First Team: Kelsey Plum (2026)
- All-Unrivaled Second Team: Aliyah Boston (2026)
- Defensive Player of the Year: Aliyah Boston (2026)
