= Vinyl BC =

- League: Unrivaled
- Founded: 2025
- History: Vinyl BC since 2025
- Arena: Wayfair Arena
- Location: Miami, Florida
- Team colors
- Head coach: Teresa Weatherspoon (2025–present)
- Team captain: Arike Ogunbowale (2025) Dearica Hamby (2026)
- Ownership: Unrivaled
- Website: Website

Vinyl Basketball Club, also known as Vinyl BC, is an American professional basketball team. They are a member of the Unrivaled basketball league, and made their debut in 2025. The teams are based in Miami, Florida, and Vinyl is led by coach Teresa Weatherspoon.

== History ==
On October 24, 2024, the Unrivaled basketball league announced the names and logos of six teams joining its league, which are Laces BC, Lunar Owls BC, Mist BC, Rose BC, Phantom BC, and Vinyl BC. Vinyl BC, along with the other five teams, are based in Miami, Florida for the inaugural 2025 season, before the teams began travelling more frequently during the 2026 season. The six head coaches were later hired on November 15.

On September 10, 2025, Unrivaled announced they were adding two new teams to the league, Breeze BC and Hive BC.

== Roster ==
=== 2025 season ===
On November 20, 2024, the six head coaches collaborated on balancing and choosing the rosters for the six teams. Vinyl’s roster was finalized with Arike Ogunbowale, Jordin Canada, Rhyne Howard, Rae Burrell, Aliyah Boston, and Dearica Hamby as its players.

2025 Vinyl BC roster
Players
Arike Ogunbowale	Jordin Canada	Rhyne Howard	Rae Burrell	Aliyah Boston	Dearica Hamby

=== 2026 season ===
2026 Vinyl BC roster
Players
Brittney Griner	Rae Burrell	Erica Wheeler	Dearica Hamby	Rhyne Howard	Courtney Williams

=== 2027 season ===
2027 Vinyl BC roster
Players
Allisha Gray	Flau'jae Johnson	Jordin Canada	Dearica Hamby	Rhyne Howard	Aneesah Morrow

== 2025 schedule ==
=== Regular season ===
2025 Vinyl BC
Total: 5–9 (home: 3–4; road: 2–5)
January: 2–2 (home: 1–1; road: 1–1)

Game	Date	Team	Score	High points	High rebounds	High assists	Location	Record
1	January 17	@ Rose BC	W 79–73	Rhyne Howard (33)	Dearica Hamby (13)	Dearica Hamby (4)	Wayfair Arena	1–0
2	January 20	Phantom BC	W 84–69	Dearica Hamby (22)	Rhyne Howard (8)	Tied – 3 players (4)	Wayfair Arena	2–0
3	January 24	@ Laces BC	L 79–83	Dearica Hamby (18)	Dearica Hamby (8)	Tied – 3 players (4)	Wayfair Arena	2–1
4	January 27	Lunar Owls BC	L 57–67	Boston & Canada (14)	Arike Ogunbowale (10)	Arike Ogunbowale (7)	Wayfair Arena	2–2

February: 3–4 (home: 2–1; road: 1–3)

Game	Date	Team	Score	High points	High rebounds	High assists	Location	Record
5	February 1	@ Mist BC	L 67–77	Dearica Hamby (35)	Dearica Hamby (15)	Arike Ogunbowale (6)	Wayfair Arena	2–3
6	February 3	@ Lunar Owls BC	L 68–85	Rhyne Howard (21)	Dearica Hamby (10)	Tied – 3 players (3)	Wayfair Arena	2–4
7	February 8	Laces BC	W 11–0	Game canceled – Laces forfeit				3–4
8	February 18	Rose BC	L 55–61	Rhyne Howard (24)	Dearica Hamby (11)	Burrell & Ogunbowale (3)	Wayfair Arena	3–5
9	February 21	Mist BC	W 72–65	Rhyne Howard (26)	Dearica Hamby (9)	Jordin Canada (5)	Wayfair Arena	4–5
10	February 22	@ Phantom BC	L 72-79	Rhyne Howard (28)	Jordin Canada (10)	Jordin Canada (8)	Wayfair Arena	4-6
11	February 28	@ Laces BC	W 64-63	Rhyne Howard (24)	Aliyah Boston (10)	Jordin Canada (6)	Wayfair Arena	5-6

March: 0–3 (home: 0–2; road: 0–1)

Game	Date	Team	Score	High points	High rebounds	High assists	Location	Record
12	March 1	Lunar Owls BC	L 72-78	Dearica Hamby (31)	Dearica Hamby (11)	Jordin Canada (8)	Wayfair Arena	5-7
13	March 8	Phantom BC	L 74-80	Rhyne Howard (37)	Rhyne Howard (12)	Rhyne Howard (5)	Wayfair Arena	5-8
14	March 10	@ Rose BC	L 46-74	Hamby & Howard (12)	Dearica Hamby (13)	Jordin Canada (3)	Wayfair Arena	5-9

== 2025 ==
Rhyne Howard was named to the All-Unrivaled Second Team.

== 2026 ==
On January 11, Dearica Hamby became the first Unrivaled player to have a 40 point game, breaking the previous records of 38 points in the regular season and 39 points in the playoffs.

== Honors and awards ==
- All-Unrivaled Second Team: Rhyne Howard (2025)
