= List of current WNBA team rosters =

Below is a list of current WNBA team rosters.

== Eastern Conference ==
=== Atlanta Dream ===
Atlanta Dream roster
Players
Coaches

Pos.	No.	Nat.	Name	Height	Weight	DOB	From	Yrs
G	20	(Australia)	Borlase, Isobel	5' 11" (1.8m)		2004-09-12	Australia	R
G	3	(United States)	Canada, Jordin	5' 6" (1.68m)	135 lb (61kg)	1995-08-11	UCLA	8
G	15	(United States)	Gray, Allisha	6' 0" (1.83m)	167 lb (76kg)	1995-01-12	South Carolina	9
F	00	(United States)	Hillmon, Naz	6' 2" (1.88m)	190 lb (86kg)	2000-04-05	Michigan	4
F	10	(United States)	Howard, Rhyne	6' 2" (1.88m)	175 lb (79kg)	2000-04-29	Kentucky	4
C	42	(United States)	Jones, Brionna (injured)	6' 3" (1.91m)	215 lb (98kg)	1995-12-18	Maryland	9
F	23	(Mali)	Koné, Sika	6' 3" (1.91m)	180 lb (82kg)	2002-07-13	Mali	3
G	21	(United States)	Nivar, Indya	5' 10" (1.78m)		2004-01-16	North Carolina	R
G/F	32	(United States)	Nye, Aaliyah (injured)	6' 0" (1.83m)		2002-08-14	Alabama	1
C	11	(Kenya)	Okot, Madina	6' 6" (1.98m)		2004-08-23	South Carolina	R
G	2	(United States)	Paopao, Te-Hina	5' 9" (1.75m)		2002-08-21	South Carolina	1
F	5	(United States)	Reese, Angel	6' 4" (1.93m)	165 lb (75kg)	2002-05-06	LSU	2
G	4	(United States)	Sherrod, Jaylyn	5' 7" (1.7m)	147 lb (67kg)	2001-10-21	Colorado	2
G	33	(United States)	Walker-Kimbrough, Shatori	5' 9" (1.75m)	140 lb (64kg)	1995-05-18	Maryland	9

Head coach
(United States) Karl Smesko (Kent State)
Assistant coaches
(United States) Camryn Brown (High Point)
(United States) Chelsea Lyles (Florida Gulf Coast)
(United States) Brandi Poole (Sewanee)
(United States) LaToya Sanders (North Carolina)
Athletic trainer
(United States) Katie Buria (Arkansas)
Strength and conditioning coach
(United States) Shannon Jackson (Auburn)

Legend

- (C) Team captain
- (DP) Unsigned draft pick
- (FA) Free agent
- (S) Suspended
- Injured

WNBA roster page

East
ATL
CHI
CON
IND
NY
TOR
WAS
West
DAL
GS
LV
LA
MIN
PHO
POR
SEA

=== Chicago Sky ===
Chicago Sky roster
Players
Coaches

Pos.	No.	Nat.	Name	Height	Weight	DOB	From	Yrs
G	24	(United States)	Banham, Rachel	5' 9" (1.75m)	175 lb (79kg)	1993-07-15	Minnesota	9
C	10	(Brazil)	Cardoso, Kamilla	6' 7" (2.01m)	215 lb (98kg)	2001-04-30	South Carolina	2
G/F	7	(United States)	Carrington, DiJonai	5' 11" (1.8m)	175 lb (79kg)	1998-01-08	Baylor	5
G	9	(United States)	Cloud, Natasha	5' 10" (1.78m)	160 lb (73kg)	1992-02-22	Saint Joseph's	10
G	35	(Mali)	Coulibaly, Aicha	6' 0" (1.83m)		2001-10-18	Texas A&M	R
G	4	(United States)	Diggins, Skylar (injured)	5' 9" (1.75m)	140 lb (64kg)	1990-08-02	Notre Dame	10
F	5	(United States)	Jackson, Rickea (injured)	6' 2" (1.88m)	175 lb (79kg)	2001-03-16	Tennessee	2
G	11	(Mexico)	Jaquez, Gabriela	6' 0" (1.83m)		2003-11-19	UCLA	R
G	0	(United States)	Sheldon, Jacy	5' 10" (1.78m)	140 lb (64kg)	2000-08-23	Ohio State	2
F/C	30	(United States)	Stevens, Azurá	6' 6" (1.98m)	180 lb (82kg)	1996-02-01	Connecticut	7
G	12	(United States)	Taylor, Sydney	5' 9" (1.75m)		2001-06-21	Louisville	R
G	22	(Hungary)	Vandersloot, Courtney	5' 8" (1.73m)	137 lb (62kg)	1989-02-08	Gonzaga	14
F	21	(United States)	Westbeld, Maddy	6' 3" (1.91m)		2002-02-10	Notre Dame	1
C	1	(United States)	Williams, Elizabeth	6' 3" (1.91m)	200 lb (91kg)	1993-06-23	Duke	10
F	–	(Slovenia)	Sivka, Ajša (DP)	6' 4" (1.93m)		2005-11-23	Slovenia	–

Head coach
(United States) Tyler Marsh (Birmingham–Southern)
Assistant coaches
(United States) Kelly Faris (Connecticut)
(United States) Jhared Simpson (Wheeling)
(United States) Latricia Trammell (East Central)
(United States) Rena Wakama (Western Carolina)
Player development
(United States) David Simon (Purdue Fort Wayne)
Athletic trainer
(United States) Meghan Lockerby
Strength and conditioning coach
(United States) Ann Crosby

Legend

- (C) Team captain
- (DP) Unsigned draft pick
- (FA) Free agent
- (S) Suspended
- Injured

WNBA roster page

East
ATL
CHI
CON
IND
NY
TOR
WAS
West
DAL
GS
LV
LA
MIN
PHO
POR
SEA

=== Connecticut Sun ===
Connecticut Sun roster
Players
Coaches

Pos.	No.	Nat.	Name	Height	Weight	DOB	From	Yrs
F	33	(France)	Angloma, Nell	6' 1" (1.85m)		2006-06-12	France	R
F	15	(United States)	Beers, Raegan	6' 4" (1.93m)	244 lb (111kg)	2004-07-23	Oklahoma	R
G/F	25	(United States)	Burke, Kennedy	6' 1" (1.85m)	199 lb (90kg)	1997-02-14	UCLA	6
F	8	(Canada)	Edwards, Aaliyah (injured)	6' 3" (1.91m)	206 lb (93kg)	2002-07-09	Connecticut	2
C	42	(United States)	Griner, Brittney (injured)	6' 9" (2.06m)	219 lb (99kg)	1990-10-18	Baylor	11
G	3	(United States)	Jackson, Ashlon	6' 0" (1.83m)	170 lb (77kg)	2004-01-06	Duke	R
G	5	(United States)	Kneepkens, Gianna	5' 11" (1.8m)	174 lb (79kg)	2003-03-04	UCLA	R
G	47	(France)	Lacan, Leïla	5' 11" (1.8m)		2004-06-02	France	1
G	4	(New Zealand)	Leger-Walker, Charlisse	5' 10" (1.78m)	190 lb (86kg)	2001-09-15	UCLA	R
F	1	(United States)	Miller, Diamond	6' 1" (1.85m)	178 lb (81kg)	2001-02-11	Maryland	3
C	10	(United States)	Nelson-Ododa, Olivia	6' 5" (1.96m)	179 lb (81kg)	2000-08-17	Connecticut	3
G	22	(United States)	Rivers, Saniya	6' 1" (1.85m)	159 lb (72kg)	2003-03-04	NC State	1
G	2	(United States)	Van Lith, Hailey	5' 9" (1.75m)	157 lb (71kg)	2001-09-09	TCU	1

Head coach
(France) Rachid Meziane
Assistant coaches
(Belgium) Pascal Angillis
(United States) Roneeka Hodges (Florida State)
(United States) Ashlee McGee (Austin Peay)
Player development
(United States) Kevin Owens (Trinity University)
(United States) Bak Sawi (Allegany College of Maryland)
Athletic trainer
(United States) Terri Acosta (North Texas)
Assistant trainer
(United States) Brianna Robinson (FIU)
Strength and conditioning coach
(United States) Analisse Rios (Connecticut College)

Legend

- (C) Team captain
- (DP) Unsigned draft pick
- (FA) Free agent
- (S) Suspended
- Injured

WNBA roster page

East
ATL
CHI
CON
IND
NY
TOR
WAS
West
DAL
GS
LV
LA
MIN
PHO
POR
SEA

=== Indiana Fever ===
Indiana Fever roster
Players
Coaches

Pos.	No.	Nat.	Name	Height	Weight	DOB	From	Yrs
F	25	(United States)	Billings, Monique	6' 4" (1.93m)	190 lb (86kg)	1996-05-02	UCLA	8
F/C	7	(United States)	Boston, Aliyah	6' 5" (1.96m)	220 lb (100kg)	2001-12-11	South Carolina	3
G	22	(United States)	Clark, Caitlin	6' 0" (1.83m)	157 lb (71kg)	2002-01-22	Iowa	2
G/F	8	(United States)	Cunningham, Sophie	6' 1" (1.85m)	165 lb (75kg)	1996-08-16	Missouri	7
F/C	12	(Brazil)	Dantas, Damiris (injured)	6' 4" (1.93m)	214 lb (97kg)	1992-11-17	Brazil	10
G	23	(United States)	Hall, Bree	6' 0" (1.83m)	161 lb (73kg)	2003-06-28	South Carolina	1
G	52	(United States)	Harris, Tyasha	5' 10" (1.78m)	152 lb (69kg)	1998-05-01	South Carolina	6
F	2	(United States)	Hines-Allen, Myisha	6' 2" (1.88m)	200 lb (91kg)	1995-05-30	Louisville	8
G/F	10	(United States)	Hull, Lexie	6' 2" (1.88m)	155 lb (70kg)	1999-09-13	Stanford	4
G	3	(United States)	Johnson, Raven	5' 8" (1.73m)	167 lb (76kg)	2003-03-04	South Carolina	R
G	0	(United States)	Mitchell, Kelsey	5' 8" (1.73m)	155 lb (70kg)	1995-11-12	Ohio State	8
C	1	(United States)	Onyiah, Ugonne	6' 3" (1.91m)		2002-03-12	California	R
F/C	21	(United States)	Timpson, Makayla	6' 2" (1.88m)	173 lb (78kg)	2002-09-20	Florida State	1
F	14	(United States)	VanSlooten, Grace	6' 3" (1.91m)	180 lb (82kg)	2004-06-16	Michigan State	R

Head coach
(United States) Stephanie White (Purdue)
Assistant coaches
(United States) Briann January (Arizona State)
(United States) Karima Christmas-Kelly (Duke)
(United States) Austin Kelly (Duke)
Player development
(United States) Rob Dosier (Southern Illinois University Carbondale)
(United States) Keith Porter (Connecticut Avery Point)
Athletic trainer
(United States) Todd Champlin (Daemen)
Assistant trainer
(United States) Alexis Gholston (Sacramento State)
Strength and conditioning coach
(United States) Sarah Kessler (Queensland)

Legend

- (C) Team captain
- (DP) Unsigned draft pick
- (FA) Free agent
- (S) Suspended
- Injured

WNBA roster page

East
ATL
CHI
CON
IND
NY
TOR
WAS
West
DAL
GS
LV
LA
MIN
PHO
POR
SEA

=== New York Liberty ===
New York Liberty roster
Players
Coaches

Pos.	No.	Nat.	Name	Height	Weight	DOB	From	Yrs
G/F	9	(Australia)	Allen, Rebecca	6' 2" (1.88m)	162 lb (73kg)	1992-11-06	Australia	9
G	18	(France)	Astier, Pauline	5' 10" (1.78m)		2002-02-15	France	R
F/C	14	(Spain)	Carrera, Raquel	6' 3" (1.91m)		2001-10-31	Spain	R
G	4	(France)	Fauthoux, Marine	5' 9" (1.75m)		2001-01-23	France	R
F	13	(Germany)	Fiebich, Leonie (injured)	6' 4" (1.93m)		2000-01-10	Germany	2
G	7	(United States)	Gardner, Rebekah	6' 1" (1.85m)	130 lb (59kg)	1990-07-09	UCLA	2
G	20	(United States)	Ionescu, Sabrina	5' 11" (1.8m)	165 lb (75kg)	1997-12-06	Oregon	5
G	23	(France)	Johannès, Marine	5' 10" (1.78m)	134 lb (61kg)	1995-01-21	France	3
C	35	(The Bahamas)	Jones, Jonquel	6' 6" (1.98m)	215 lb (98kg)	1994-01-05	George Washington	8
G/F	44	(United States)	Laney-Hamilton, Betnijah	6' 0" (1.83m)	166 lb (75kg)	1993-10-29	Rutgers	9
F	24	(Australia)	Maley, Anneli	6' 1" (1.85m)		1998-09-01	TCU	2
F	0	(Germany)	Sabally, Satou (injured)	6' 4" (1.93m)	175 lb (79kg)	1998-04-25	Oregon	5
F	30	(United States)	Stewart, Breanna	6' 4" (1.93m)	170 lb (77kg)	1994-08-27	Connecticut	8
C	21	(China)	Han Xu	6' 11" (2.11m)	203 lb (92kg)	1999-10-31	China	3

Head coach
(United States) Chris DeMarco (Dominican (CA))
Assistant coaches
(United States) Courtney Paris (Oklahoma)
(United States) Will Sheehey (Indiana)
(United States) Andrew Wade (Catholic)
(United States) Addi Walters (Stetson)
Player development
(United States) Kristen Mann (UC Santa Barbara)
Strength and conditioning coach
(United States) Emily Zaler (Concordia University Chicago)

Legend

- (C) Team captain
- (DP) Unsigned draft pick
- (FA) Free agent
- (S) Suspended
- Injured

WNBA roster page

East
ATL
CHI
CON
IND
NY
TOR
WAS
West
DAL
GS
LV
LA
MIN
PHO
POR
SEA

=== Toronto Tempo ===
Toronto Tempo roster
Players
Coaches

Pos.	No.	Nat.	Name	Height	Weight	DOB	From	Yrs
G	22	(Belgium)	Allemand, Julie	5' 8" (1.73m)	147 lb (67kg)	1996-07-07	Belgium	3
F	33	(France)	Bankole, Ornella	5' 11" (1.8m)		1997-10-17	France	R
F	10	(Spain)	Conde, María	6' 1" (1.85m)	152 lb (69kg)	1997-01-14	Florida State	R
C	14	(United Kingdom)	Fagbenle, Temi	6' 4" (1.93m)	180 lb (82kg)	1992-09-08	USC	4
F	21	(United States)	Harrison, Isabelle	6' 3" (1.91m)	183 lb (83kg)	1993-09-27	Tennessee	7
F	2	(Lithuania)	Juškaitė, Laura	6' 2" (1.88m)	176 lb (80kg)	1997-09-22	Lithuania	R
F	7	(United States)	Key, Teonni	6' 4" (1.93m)	170 lb (77kg)	2003-07-10	Kentucky	R
G	3	(United States)	Mabrey, Marina	6' 1" (1.85m)	186 lb (84kg)	1996-09-14	Notre Dame	7
F	24	(United States)	Morrow, Aneesah	6' 1" (1.85m)	178 lb (81kg)	2003-02-02	LSU	1
G	11	(Canada)	Nurse, Kia	6' 0" (1.83m)	195 lb (88kg)	1996-02-22	Connecticut	6
G	1	(United States)	Rice, Kiki	5' 11" (1.8m)	166 lb (75kg)	2004-01-04	UCLA	R
C	8	(Germany)	Sabally, Nyara	6' 5" (1.96m)	204 lb (93kg)	2000-02-26	Oregon	3
G	20	(United States)	Sykes, Brittney (injured)	5' 9" (1.75m)	154 lb (70kg)	1994-02-07	Syracuse	8

Head coach
(Australia) Sandy Brondello
Assistant coaches
(United States) Ciara Carl (North Texas)
(Canada) Carly Clarke
(United States) Sadie Edwards (USC)
(Germany) Olaf Lange
(United States) Brian Lankton (Phoenix College)

Legend

- (C) Team captain
- (DP) Unsigned draft pick
- (FA) Free agent
- (S) Suspended
- Injured

WNBA roster page

East
ATL
CHI
CON
IND
NY
TOR
WAS
West
DAL
GS
LV
LA
MIN
PHO
POR
SEA

=== Washington Mystics ===
Washington Mystics roster
Players
Coaches

Pos.	No.	Nat.	Name	Height	Weight	DOB	From	Yrs
G	8	(Australia)	Amoore, Georgia	5' 6" (1.68m)	155 lb (70kg)	2001-04-03	Kentucky	R
F/C	0	(United States)	Austin, Shakira	6' 5" (1.96m)	200 lb (91kg)	2000-07-25	Mississippi	4
C	51	(United States)	Betts, Lauren	6' 7" (2.01m)		2003-10-15	UCLA	R
G/F	22	(United States)	Citron, Sonia	6' 1" (1.85m)		2003-10-22	Notre Dame	1
F	32	(Serbia)	Dugalić, Angela	6' 4" (1.93m)		2001-12-29	UCLA	R
G	2	(Spain)	Flórez Getino, Alicia	5' 9" (1.75m)		2004-04-19	Spain	R
F	44	(United States)	Iriafen, Kiki	6' 3" (1.91m)		2003-08-26	USC	1
G	33	(United States)	Olsen, Lucy	5' 10" (1.78m)		2003-05-26	Iowa	1
F	12	(United States)	Onyenwere, Michaela	6' 0" (1.83m)	178 lb (81kg)	1999-08-10	UCLA	5
G	3	(United States)	Harmon, Rori	5' 6" (1.68m)		2003-01-29	Texas	R
G/F	5	(United States)	Littlepage-Buggs, Darianna	6' 1" (1.85m)		2003-09-23	Baylor	R
G	23	(United States)	McMahon, Cotie	6' 0" (1.83m)		2004-05-04	Mississippi	R
G	18	(Canada)	Prosper, Cassandre	6' 3" (1.91m)		2005-06-25	Notre Dame	R

Head coach
(United States) Sydney Johnson (Princeton)
Assistant coaches
(United States) Jessie Miller (UIC)
(United States) Barbara Turner (Connecticut)
(Turkey) Emre Vatansever
Player development
(United States) Clinton Crouch (Saint Francis)
Athletic trainer
(United States) Christina Kennedy

Legend

- (C) Team captain
- (DP) Unsigned draft pick
- (FA) Free agent
- (S) Suspended
- Injured

WNBA roster page

East
ATL
CHI
CON
IND
NY
TOR
WAS
West
DAL
GS
LV
LA
MIN
PHO
POR
SEA

== Western Conference ==
=== Dallas Wings ===
Dallas Wings roster
Players
Coaches

Pos.	No.	Nat.	Name	Height	Weight	DOB	From	Yrs
G	5	(United States)	Bueckers, Paige	6' 0" (1.83m)	141 lb (64kg)	2001-10-20	Connecticut	1
F	7	(Israel)	Clark, Alysha	5' 11" (1.8m)	167 lb (76kg)	1987-07-07	Middle Tennessee	13
G	35	(United States)	Fudd, Azzi	5' 11" (1.8m)	165 lb (75kg)	2002-11-11	Connecticut	R
G	10	(United States)	James, Aziaha	5' 10" (1.78m)		2002-11-19	NC State	1
F/C	34	(Finland)	Kuier, Awak	6' 4" (1.93m)	168 lb (76kg)	2001-08-19	Finland	3
C	28	(China)	Li Yueru	6' 7" (2.01m)		1999-03-28	China	3
G	24	(United States)	Ogunbowale, Arike	5' 8" (1.73m)	165 lb (75kg)	1997-03-02	Notre Dame	7
F	32	(Slovenia)	Shepard, Jessica	6' 4" (1.93m)	175 lb (79kg)	1996-09-11	Notre Dame	5
F	20	(United States)	Siegrist, Maddy	6' 2" (1.88m)	175 lb (79kg)	2000-05-22	Villanova	3
G	1	(United States)	Sims, Odyssey	5' 8" (1.73m)	155 lb (70kg)	1992-07-13	Baylor	12
C	8	(Australia)	Smith, Alanna	6' 4" (1.93m)	177 lb (80kg)	1996-09-10	Stanford	7
G	6	(Italy)	Verona, Costanza	5' 6" (1.68m)		1999-08-06	Italy	R
G	–	(Mexico)	Lopez Sénéchal, Lou (S)	6' 1" (1.85m)	155 lb (70kg)	1998-05-12	Connecticut	1

Head coach
(United States) Jose Fernandez (FIU)
Assistant coaches
(United States) Camille Smith (North Carolina)
(United States) Mike Neighbors (Arkansas)
(United States) David Adkins (Radford)
(United States) Empress Davenport (Texas)

Legend

- (C) Team captain
- (DP) Unsigned draft pick
- (FA) Free agent
- (S) Suspended
- Injured

WNBA roster page

East
ATL
CHI
CON
IND
NY
TOR
WAS
West
DAL
GS
LV
LA
MIN
PHO
POR
SEA

=== Golden State Valkyries ===
Golden State Valkyries roster
Players
Coaches

Pos.	No.	Nat.	Name	Height	Weight	DOB	From	Yrs
F	3	(Canada)	Amihere, Laeticia	6' 3" (1.91m)	185 lb (84kg)	2001-07-10	South Carolina	3
G	22	(United States)	Burton, Veronica	5' 9" (1.75m)	155 lb (70kg)	2000-07-12	Northwestern	4
G/F	6	(United States)	Charles, Kaila	6' 1" (1.85m)	168 lb (76kg)	1998-03-23	Maryland	5
G	2	(United States)	Chen, Kaitlyn	5' 9" (1.75m)		2002-02-22	Connecticut	1
C	45	(United States)	Fingall, Nadia	6' 4" (1.93m)		1998-08-12	Stanford	R
G	15	(Azerbaijan)	Hayes, Tiffany	5' 10" (1.78m)	155 lb (70kg)	1989-09-20	Connecticut	13
G/F	4	(Lithuania)	Jocytė, Justė	6' 2" (1.88m)		2005-11-19	Lithuania	R
F	11	(United States)	Prechtel, Ashten	6' 5" (1.96m)		2001-05-11	Stanford	R
C	12	(France)	Rupert, Iliana	6' 4" (1.93m)	189 lb (86kg)	2001-07-12	France	2
F	13	(France)	Salaün, Janelle	6' 2" (1.88m)		2001-09-05	France	1
G	7	(Australia)	Sowah, Miela	5' 10" (1.78m)	148 lb (67kg)	2000-06-04	Duke	R
C	41	(United States)	Stokes, Kiah	6' 3" (1.91m)	191 lb (87kg)	1993-03-30	Connecticut	10
F	5	(United States)	Thornton, Kayla	6' 1" (1.85m)	190 lb (86kg)	1992-10-20	UTEP	10
F	1	(France)	Williams, Gabby	5' 11" (1.8m)	172 lb (78kg)	1996-09-09	Connecticut	8
F	24	(Italy)	Zandalasini, Cecilia	6' 2" (1.88m)	175 lb (79kg)	1996-03-16	Italy	4

Head coach
(United States) Natalie Nakase (UCLA)
Assistant coaches
(United States) Kasib Powell (Texas Tech)
(United States) Sugar Rodgers (Georgetown)
(United States) Landon Tatum (Idaho)
Player development
(United States) Sidney Parsons (Bridgeport)
Athletic trainer
(United States) Katelin Knox
Assistant trainer
(United States) Allison DeKuiper

Legend

- (C) Team captain
- (DP) Unsigned draft pick
- (FA) Free agent
- (S) Suspended
- Injured

WNBA roster page

East
ATL
CHI
CON
IND
NY
TOR
WAS
West
DAL
GS
LV
LA
MIN
PHO
POR
SEA

=== Las Vegas Aces ===
Las Vegas Aces roster
Players
Coaches

Pos.	No.	Nat.	Name	Height	Weight	DOB	From	Yrs
F	2	(United States)	Barker, Janiah (injured)	6' 4" (1.93m)	185 lb (84kg)	2003-11-08	Tennessee	R
F	1	(United States)	Bell, Kierstan	6' 1" (1.85m)	176 lb (80kg)	2000-03-16	Florida Gulf Coast	4
G	11	(United States)	Evans, Dana (injured)	5' 6" (1.68m)	145 lb (66kg)	1998-08-01	Louisville	5
G	12	(United States)	Gray, Chelsea	5' 11" (1.8m)	170 lb (77kg)	1992-10-08	Duke	11
G	00	(United States)	Latson, Ta'Niya	5' 9" (1.75m)		2003-12-26	South Carolina	R
G	24	(United States)	Loyd, Jewell	5' 11" (1.8m)	175 lb (79kg)	1993-10-05	Notre Dame	11
F	32	(United States)	Parker-Tyus, Cheyenne	6' 4" (1.93m)	193 lb (88kg)	1992-08-22	Middle Tennessee	11
G/F	13	(United States)	Pissott, Justine	6' 4" (1.93m)	175 lb (79kg)	2004-02-04	Vanderbilt	R
F	3	(United States)	Smith, NaLyssa	6' 4" (1.93m)	185 lb (84kg)	2000-08-08	Baylor	4
F	7	(Australia)	Talbot, Stephanie	6' 2" (1.88m)	192 lb (87kg)	1994-06-15	Australia	7
F/C	21	(United States)	Turner, Brianna	6' 3" (1.91m)	175 lb (79kg)	1996-07-05	Notre Dame	7
C	22	(United States)	Wilson, A'ja (injured)	6' 4" (1.93m)	195 lb (88kg)	1996-08-08	South Carolina	8
G	18	(Japan)	Yamamoto, Mai	5' 5" (1.65m)		1999-10-23	Japan	R
G	0	(United States)	Young, Jackie	6' 0" (1.83m)	165 lb (75kg)	1997-09-16	Notre Dame	7

Head coach
(United States) Becky Hammon (Colorado State)
Assistant coaches
(United States) Tyrone Ellis (Southern Nazarene)
(United States) Nola Henry (College of Charleston)
(United States) Larry Lewis (Morehouse)
(United States) Charlene Thomas-Swinson (Auburn)
Athletic trainer
(United States) Bryson Creer (BYU)

Legend

- (C) Team captain
- (DP) Unsigned draft pick
- (FA) Free agent
- (S) Suspended
- Injured

WNBA roster page

East
ATL
CHI
CON
IND
NY
TOR
WAS
West
DAL
GS
LV
LA
MIN
PHO
POR
SEA

=== Los Angeles Sparks ===
Los Angeles Sparks roster
Players
Coaches

Pos.	No.	Nat.	Name	Height	Weight	DOB	From	Yrs
G	8	(Cameroon)	Akoa Makani, Monique	5' 11" (1.8m)		2001-02-04	Cameroon	1
G	7	(United States)	Atkins, Ariel	5' 8" (1.73m)	167 lb (76kg)	1996-07-30	Texas	8
F	22	(United States)	Brink, Cameron	6' 4" (1.93m)	170 lb (77kg)	2001-12-31	Stanford	2
G/F	12	(United States)	Burrell, Rae	6' 2" (1.88m)	168 lb (76kg)	2000-06-21	Tennessee	3
F	32	(United States)	Cannon, Emma	6' 2" (1.88m)	190 lb (86kg)	1989-06-01	Florida Southern	6
G	2	(United States)	Gray, Chance	5' 9" (1.75m)		2004-07-06	Ohio State	R
F	5	(United States)	Hamby, Dearica	6' 3" (1.91m)	189 lb (86kg)	1993-11-06	Wake Forest	10
G	21	(United States)	Martin, Kate	6' 0" (1.83m)	172 lb (78kg)	2000-06-05	Iowa	3
G	-	(United States)	Morgan, Tonie			2004-07-16	Kentucky	R
F	30	(United States)	Ogwumike, Nneka	6' 2" (1.88m)	190 lb (86kg)	1990-07-02	Stanford	13
G	6	(South Korea)	Park, Ji-hyun	6' 1" (1.85m)		2000-04-07	South Korea	R
G	17	(United States)	Wheeler, Erica	5' 7" (1.7m)	143 lb (65kg)	1991-05-02	Rutgers	9
G	23	(United States)	Williams, Kiana	5' 8" (1.73m)	140 lb (64kg)	1999-04-09	Stanford	4

Head coach
(United States) Lynne Roberts (Seattle Pacific)
Assistant coaches
(United States) Zak Buncik (UT Arlington)
(United States) Ebony Hoffman (USC)
(United States) Zach O'Brien (St. Joseph's College of Maine)
Athletic trainer
(United States) Karissa Scherer
(United States) Tavon Spears

Legend

- (C) Team captain
- (DP) Unsigned draft pick
- (FA) Free agent
- (S) Suspended
- Injured

WNBA roster page

East
ATL
CHI
CON
IND
NY
TOR
WAS
West
DAL
GS
LV
LA
MIN
PHO
POR
SEA

=== Minnesota Lynx ===
Minnesota Lynx roster
Players
Coaches

Pos.	No.	Nat.	Name	Height	Weight	DOB	From	Yrs
F	55	(Australia)	Bibby, Chloe	6' 2" (1.88m)	194 lb (88kg)	1998-06-15	Maryland	1
G	3	(United States)	Caldwell, Maya	5' 11" (1.8m)	160 lb (73kg)	1998-12-15	Georgia	4
C	22	(Czech Republic)	Čechová, Emma (injured)	6' 5" (1.96m)	180 lb (82kg)	2004-07-12	Czech Republic	R
F	12	(United States)	Coffey, Nia	6' 1" (1.85m)	177 lb (80kg)	1995-06-11	Northwestern	9
F	24	(United States)	Collier, Napheesa (C)	6' 1" (1.85m)	182 lb (83kg)	1996-09-23	Connecticut	7
G	8	(Belgium)	Delaere, Antonia	5' 11" (1.8m)	155 lb (70kg)	1994-08-01	Belgium	R
F	1	(United States)	Howard, Natasha	6' 3" (1.91m)	172 lb (78kg)	1991-09-02	Florida State	12
G	11	(Czech Republic)	Joklová, Eliška	6' 0" (1.83m)	162 lb (73kg)	2001-10-01	Czech Republic	R
C	14	(Hungary)	Juhász, Dorka	6' 5" (1.96m)	201 lb (91kg)	1999-12-18	Connecticut	2
F	2	(United States)	King, Liatu	5' 11" (1.8m)	178 lb (81kg)	2002-02-10	Notre Dame	1
F	7	(Russia)	Kosu, Anastasiia	6' 1" (1.85m)	190 lb (86kg)	2005-04-21	Russia	1
G	21	(United States)	McBride, Kayla	5' 11" (1.8m)	179 lb (81kg)	1992-06-25	Notre Dame	12
G	5	(United States)	Miles, Olivia	5' 10" (1.78m)	168 lb (76kg)	2003-01-29	TCU	R
G	10	(United States)	Williams, Courtney	5' 8" (1.73m)	147 lb (67kg)	1994-05-11	South Florida	10

Head coach
(United States) Cheryl Reeve (La Salle)
Assistant coaches
(United States) Rebekkah Brunson (Georgetown)
(United States) Janel McCarville (Minnesota)
(United States) Eric Thibault (Missouri)
(United States) Lindsay Whalen (Minnesota)
Athletic trainer
(United States) Chuck Barta (UW–La Crosse)
Assistant trainer
(United States) Brandi BlueArm (Minnesota State)
Strength and conditioning coach
(United States) Andrea Hayden (Missouri Baptist)

Legend

- (C) Team captain
- (DP) Unsigned draft pick
- (FA) Free agent
- (S) Suspended
- Injured

WNBA roster page

East
ATL
CHI
CON
IND
NY
TOR
WAS
West
DAL
GS
LV
LA
MIN
PHO
POR
SEA

=== Phoenix Mercury ===
Phoenix Mercury roster
Players
Coaches

Pos.	No.	Nat.	Name	Height	Weight	DOB	From	Yrs
F	11	(France)	Ayayi, Valériane	6' 1" (1.85m)		1994-04-29	France	1
G/F	24	(North Macedonia)	Bonner, DeWanna	6' 4" (1.93m)	140 lb (64kg)	1987-08-21	Auburn	16
G/F	1	(France)	Brochant, Noémie	5' 11" (1.8m)		1999-10-25	France	R
G	5	(United States)	Ciezki, Shay	5' 7" (1.7m)		2003-11-26	Indiana	R
G/F	2	(United States)	Copper, Kahleah	6' 1" (1.85m)	165 lb (75kg)	1994-08-28	Rutgers	9
G	12	(United States)	Dunn, Kara	5' 11" (1.8m)		2003-12-06	USC	R
G	10	(United States)	Held, Lexi	5' 10" (1.78m)	150 lb (68kg)	1999-12-28	DePaul	1
C	31	(Belgium)	Linskens, Kyara	6' 4" (1.93m)	209 lb (95kg)	1996-11-13	Belgium	1
F	4	(United States)	Mack, Natasha	6' 4" (1.93m)	182 lb (83kg)	1997-11-03	Oklahoma State	2
G	0	(United States)	Plum, Kelsey (injured)	5' 8" (1.73m)	145 lb (66kg)	1994-08-24	Washington	7
F	77	(Spain)	Suárez, Marta	6' 3" (1.91m)		2002-05-07	TCU	R
F	25	(United States)	Thomas, Alyssa	6' 2" (1.88m)	203 lb (92kg)	1992-04-12	Maryland	12
G	33	(Australia)	Whitcomb, Sami	5' 10" (1.78m)	149 lb (68kg)	1988-07-20	Washington	8
G	—	(Sweden)	Holm, Klara (S)	5' 8" (1.73m)		1999-08-28	Sweden	–
G	29	(Serbia)	Nogić, Jovana (S)	6' 0" (1.83m)	170 lb (77kg)	1997-12-17	Serbia	R
G	–	(Spain)	Pueyo, Helena (S)	6' 0" (1.83m)		2001-02-13	Arizona	–
F	–	(United States)	Westbeld, Kathryn (injured) (S)	6' 3" (1.91m)		1996-01-29	Notre Dame	1

Head coach
(United States) Nate Tibbetts (South Dakota)
Assistant coaches
(United States) Kristi Toliver (Maryland)
(United States) Megan Vogel (South Dakota State)
(United States) John McCullough (Oklahoma)
(United States) TC Swirsky
(United States) Chevelle Saunsoci (Creighton)
(United States) Tangela Smith (Iowa)
Athletic trainer
(United States) Hannah Wengertsman (Boston University)
Strength and conditioning coach
(United States) Annalise Pickrel (Michigan State)

Legend

- (C) Team captain
- (DP) Unsigned draft pick
- (FA) Free agent
- (S) Suspended
- Injured

WNBA roster page

East
ATL
CHI
CON
IND
NY
TOR
WAS
West
DAL
GS
LV
LA
MIN
PHO
POR
SEA

=== Portland Fire ===
Portland Fire roster
Players
Coaches

Pos.	No.	Nat.	Name	Height	Weight	DOB	From	Yrs
G	3	(United States)	Barker, Sarah Ashlee (injured)	6' 0" (1.83m)	173 lb (78kg)	2001-09-10	Alabama	1
F	20	(Germany)	Bühner, Frieda	6' 1" (1.85m)	175 lb (79kg)	2004-05-28	Germany	R
G/F	6	(Canada)	Carleton, Bridget	6' 2" (1.88m)	190 lb (86kg)	1997-05-22	Iowa State	7
F/C	17	(Spain)	DiLeo, Megan	6' 4" (1.93m)	208 lb (94kg)	1996-12-13	Iowa	7
F	21	(United States)	Engstler, Emily	6' 1" (1.85m)	184 lb (83kg)	2000-05-01	Louisville	4
F	1	(United States)	Feagin, Sania (injured)	6' 3" (1.91m)		2003-03-15	South Carolina	1
C	15	(Germany)	Geiselsöder, Luisa	6' 4" (1.93m)	204 lb (93kg)	2000-02-10	Germany	1
G	2	(United States)	Harrison, Jordan	5' 6" (1.68m)		2004-04-26	West Virginia	R
G	0	(France)	Leite, Carla	5' 9" (1.75m)	151 lb (68kg)	2004-04-16	France	1
G	7	(Slovenia)	Oblak, Teja	5' 8" (1.73m)		1990-12-20	Slovenia	R
F	13	(Australia)	Puoch, Nyadiew	6' 3" (1.91m)		2004-06-23	Australia	R
G	44	(United Kingdom)	Samuelson, Karlie	6' 0" (1.83m)	160 lb (73kg)	1995-05-10	Stanford	7
C	25	(United States)	Williams, Serah	6' 4" (1.93m)		2004-01-17	Connecticut	R
G	77	(United Kingdom)	Winterburn, Holly	5' 11" (1.8m)		2000-10-01	Great Britain	R
G	—	(United States)	Ayrault, Julia (S)	6' 2" (1.88m)			Michigan State	–
G	—	(Spain)	Martín, Iyana (DP)	5' 9" (1.75m)		2006-01-18	Spain	–
G	—	(Croatia)	Mühl, Nika (injured) (S)	6' 0" (1.83m)	156 lb (71kg)	2001-04-09	Connecticut	1

Head coach
(United Kingdom) Alex Sarama (Nottingham)
Assistant coaches
(United States) Sefu Bernard
(United States) Danielle Boiago
(United States) Brittni Donaldson (Northern Iowa)
(United States) Sylvia Fowles (LSU)

Legend

- (C) Team captain
- (DP) Unsigned draft pick
- (FA) Free agent
- (S) Suspended
- Injured

WNBA roster page

East
ATL
CHI
CON
IND
NY
TOR
WAS
West
DAL
GS
LV
LA
MIN
PHO
POR
SEA

=== Seattle Storm ===
Seattle Storm roster
Players
Coaches

Pos.	No.	Nat.	Name	Height	Weight	DOB	From	Yrs
G	7	(United States)	Cooke, Zia	5' 9" (1.75m)	163 lb (74kg)	2001-01-09	South Carolina	2
C	31	(United States)	Dolson, Stefanie	6' 5" (1.96m)	235 lb (107kg)	1992-01-08	Connecticut	11
C	11	(Spain)	Fam, Awa	6' 4" (1.93m)		2006-06-17	Spain	R
G	2	(United States)	Hiedeman, Natisha	5' 8" (1.73m)	132 lb (60kg)	1997-02-10	Marquette	7
F	54	(United States)	Holmes, Mackenzie	6' 3" (1.91m)		2000-11-01	Indiana	1
G/F	23	(United States)	Horston, Jordan	6' 2" (1.88m)	165 lb (75kg)	2001-05-21	Tennessee	2
G	4	(United States)	Johnson, Flau'jae	5' 10" (1.78m)		2003-11-03	LSU	R
C	13	(Australia)	Magbegor, Ezi (injured)	6' 4" (1.93m)	181 lb (82kg)	1999-08-13	Australia	6
G	22	(United States)	Mair, Taina	5' 9" (1.75m)		2003-11-20	Duke	R
F/C	14	(France)	Malonga, Dominique	6' 6" (1.98m)		2005-11-16	France	1
G	5	(Australia)	Melbourne, Jade	5' 10" (1.78m)	145 lb (66kg)	2002-08-18	Australia	3
F	33	(United States)	Samuelson, Katie Lou	6' 3" (1.91m)	163 lb (74kg)	1997-06-13	Connecticut	5
G/F	3	(United States)	Thierry, Taylor	6' 1" (1.85m)		2003-01-08	Ohio State	1

Head coach
(United States) Sonia Raman (Tufts)
Assistant coaches
(Canada) Natalie Achonwa (Notre Dame)
(United States) Jarell Christian (Emory & Henry)
(United States) Michael Joiner (Florida State)
Player development
(United States) Lake Joyner (Washington)
(United States) Marcus Tibbs (Bellevue College)
Athletic trainer
(United States) Laura Mancuso (Liberty)
Strength and conditioning coach
(United States) Emily Blurton (Concordia–Chicago)

Legend

- (C) Team captain
- (DP) Unsigned draft pick
- (FA) Free agent
- (S) Suspended
- Injured

WNBA roster page

East
ATL
CHI
CON
IND
NY
TOR
WAS
West
DAL
GS
LV
LA
MIN
PHO
POR
SEA
