= List of 2026 WNBA season transactions =

This is a list of transactions that occurred during the 2025–26 WNBA off-season and the 2026 WNBA season. This includes retirements, front office transitions, player signings, and player trades. The list also includes information about the expansion draft that took place as the Portland Fire and Toronto Tempo joined the league. The list also includes information regarding in-season roster moves, such as hardship contracts, waiver wire transactions, contract suspensions, and players who are inactive.

== Front office movement ==
=== Head coaching changes ===
List of WNBA head coaching changes and hires made in the 2025–26 offseason
Departure date	Team	Outgoing head coach	Reason for departure	Hire date	Incoming head coach	Last coaching position	Ref.
September 21, 2025	Seattle Storm	Noelle Quinn	Contract not renewed	October 28, 2025	Sonia Raman	New York Liberty assistant coach (2025)	
September 23, 2025	New York Liberty	Sandy Brondello	Contract not renewed	December 3, 2025	Chris DeMarco	Golden State Warriors assistant coach (2012–2026)	
September 30, 2025	Dallas Wings	Chris Koclanes	Fired	October 28, 2025	Jose Fernandez	South Florida head coach (2000–2025)	
N/A	Portland Fire	2026 expansion team		October 17, 2025	Alex Sarama	Cleveland Cavaliers assistant coach (2024–2025)	
N/A	Toronto Tempo	2026 expansion team		November 4, 2025	Sandy Brondello	New York Liberty head coach (2022–2025)	

=== General manager changes ===
List of WNBA general manager changes and hires made in the 2025–26 offseason and 2026 regular season
Departure date	Team	Outgoing general manager	Reason for departure	Hire date	Incoming general manager	Last managerial position	Ref..
October 26, 2024	Las Vegas Aces	Natalie Williams	Contract not renewed	Vacant			
November 11, 2024	Minnesota Lynx	Clare Duwelius	Resigned	Vacant			
April 6, 2026	Washington Mystics	Jamila Wideman	"Misaligned visions"	Vacant			

== Player movement ==
=== Expansion draft ===
On April 6, 2026, an expansion draft took place to fill the rosters for the Portland Fire and Toronto Tempo.

Prior to this draft, the Chicago Sky traded draft picks to both expansion teams in exchange for roster protection.

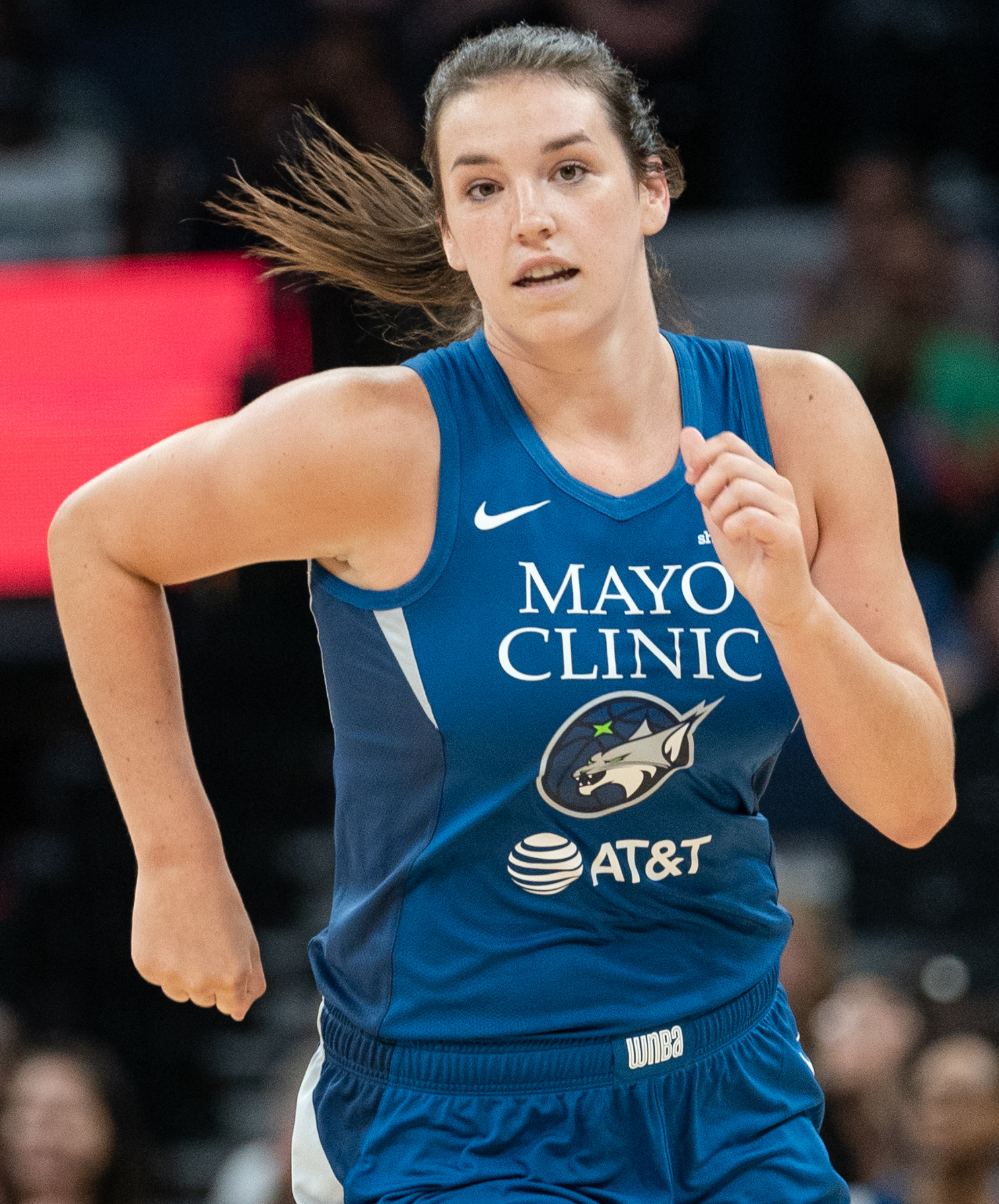
Bridget Carleton

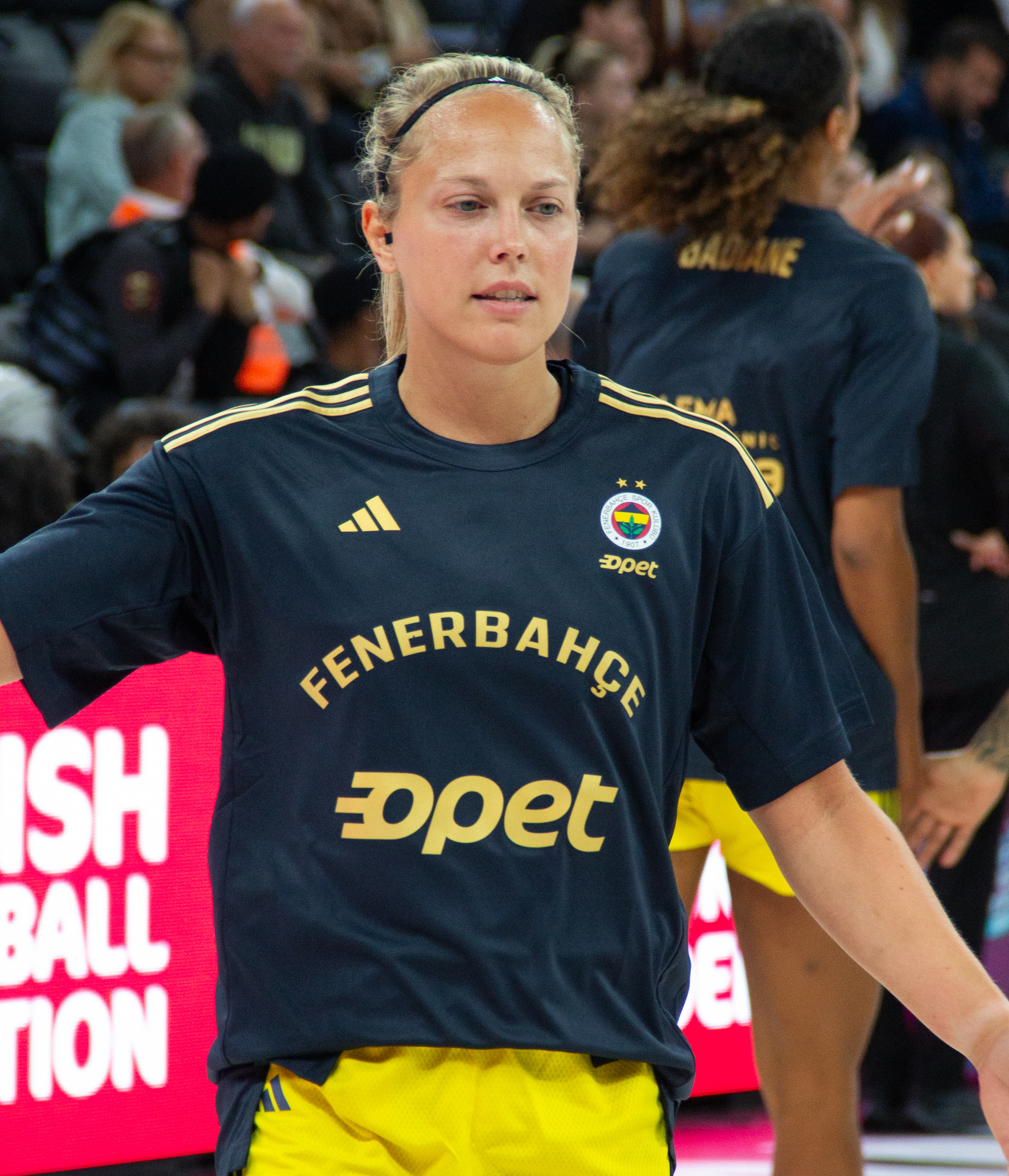
Julie Allemand

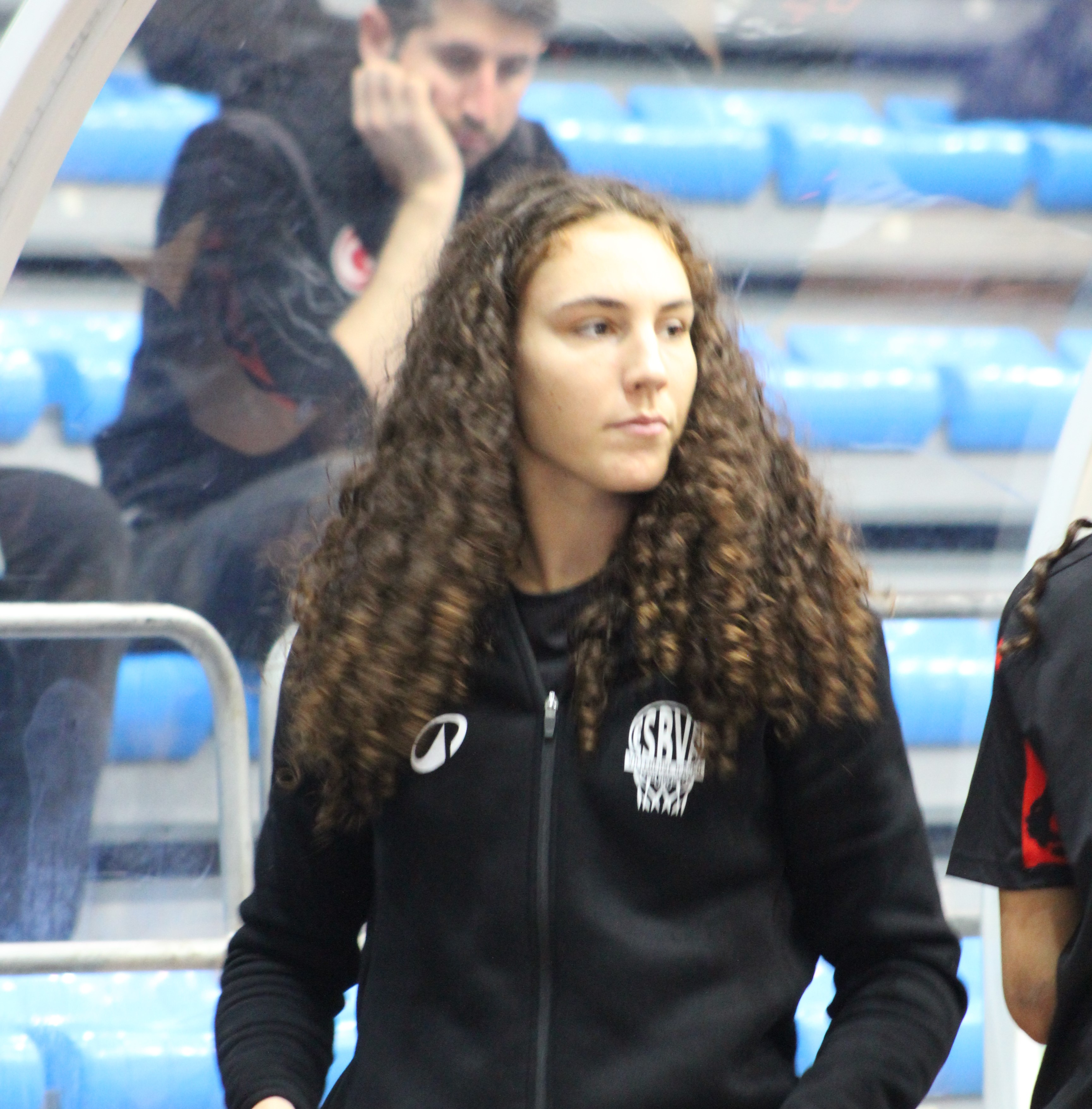
Carla Leite

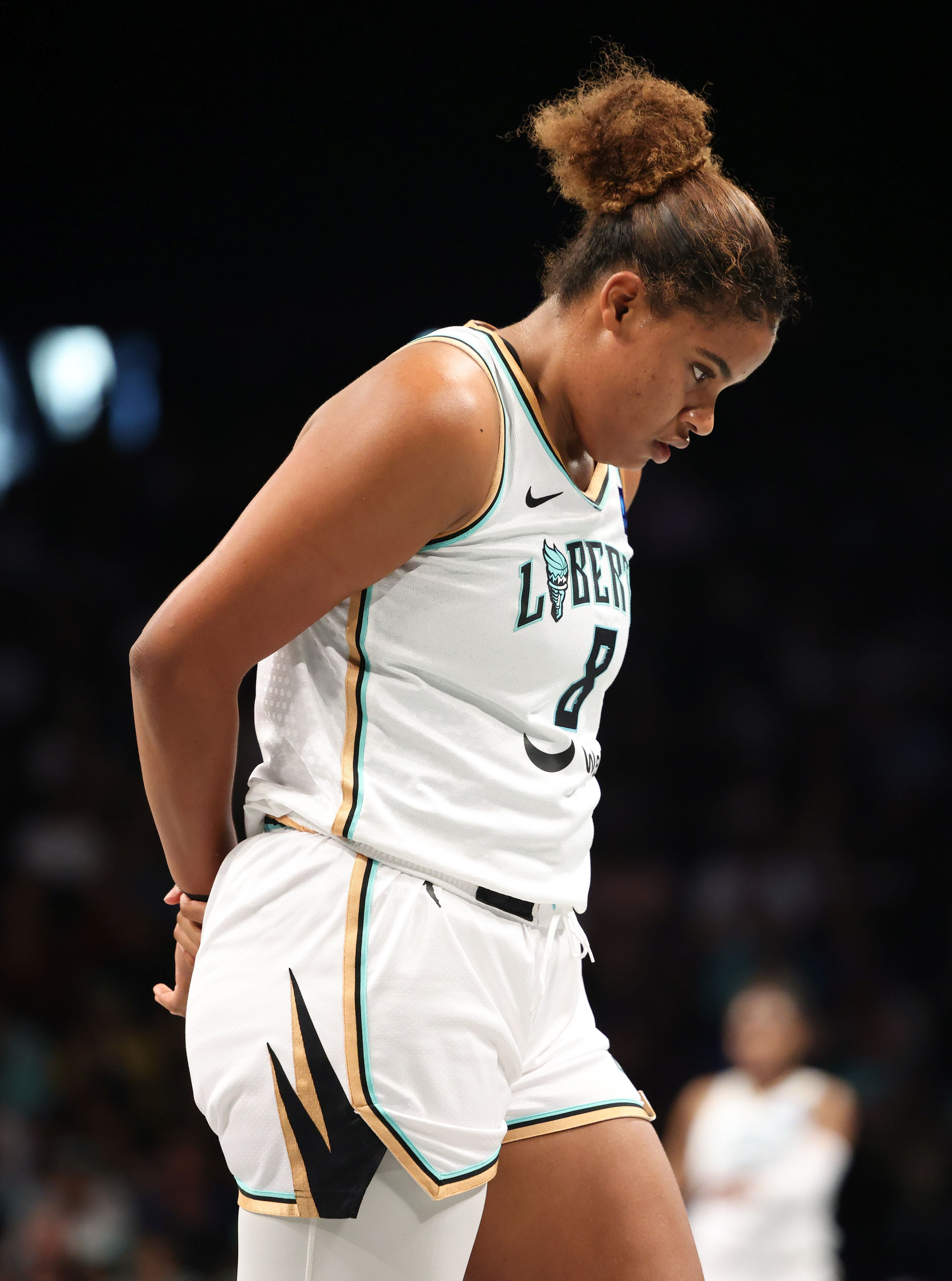
Nyara Sabally

Carleton and Leite were selected first and third respectively by the Portland Fire, and Allemand and Sabally were selected second and fourth by the Toronto Tempo.

Key
Abbreviation	Position
G	Guard
F	Forward
C	Center

^{+}	Denotes player who has been selected for at least one All-Star Game
^{#}	Denotes player who never played in the WNBA regular season or playoffs

Draft selections
Rnd.	Pick	Player	Pos.	Nationality	Team	Previous team	WNBA years (Note: Number of years played in the WNBA prior to the draft)	Career with franchise (Note: Career with the expansion franchise that drafted the player)	Ref.
1	1	Bridget Carleton	F	Canada	Portland Fire	Minnesota Lynx	7	2026–present	
1	2	Julie Allemand	G	Belgium	Toronto Tempo	Los Angeles Sparks	3	2026–present	
1	3	Carla Leite	G	France	Portland Fire	Golden State Valkyries	1	2026–present	
1	4	Nyara Sabally	C	Germany	Toronto Tempo	New York Liberty	3	2026–present	
1	5	Luisa Geiselsöder	C	Germany	Portland Fire	Dallas Wings	1	2026–present	
1	6	Marina Mabrey^{+}	G	United States	Toronto Tempo	Connecticut Sun	7	2026–present	
1	7	Emily Engstler	F	United States	Portland Fire	Washington Mystics	4	2026–present	
1	8	Aaliyah Nye	G	United States	Toronto Tempo	Las Vegas Aces	1	— (Note: Waived prior to the 2026 WNBA season)	
1	9	Maya Caldwell	G	United States	Portland Fire	Atlanta Dream	4	— (Note: Traded prior to the 2026 WNBA season)	
1	10	Lexi Held	G	United States	Toronto Tempo	Phoenix Mercury	1	2026–present	
1	11	Chloe Bibby	G	Australia	Portland Fire	Indiana Fever	1	—	
1	12	No selection / pass	—	—	Toronto Tempo	—	—	—	
2	13	María Conde	F	Spain	Toronto Tempo	Golden State Valkyries	0	2026–present	
2	14	Haley Jones	G	United States	Portland Fire	Dallas Wings	3	2026	
2	15	Maria Kliundikova	F	Russia	Toronto Tempo	Minnesota Lynx	3	— (Note: Traded on July 31, 2026 to the Connecticut Sun)	
2	16	Nyadiew Puoch	G	Australia	Portland Fire	Atlanta Dream	0	2026–present	
2	17	Adja Kane^{#}	F	France	Toronto Tempo	New York Liberty	0	—	
2	18	Sarah Ashlee Barker	G	United States	Portland Fire	Los Angeles Sparks	1	2026–present	
2	19	Nikolina Milić	F	Serbia	Toronto Tempo	Connecticut Sun	2	—	
2	20	Sug Sutton	G	United States	Portland Fire	Washington Mystics	4	2026	
2	21	Kitija Laksa	F	Latvia	Toronto Tempo	Phoenix Mercury	1	—	
2	22	No selection / pass	—	—	Portland Fire	—	—	—	
2	23	Kristy Wallace	G	Australia	Toronto Tempo	Indiana Fever	3	—	
2	24	Nika Mühl	G	Croatia	Portland Fire	Seattle Storm	1	—	

=== Trades ===
April
April 1	To Chicago Sky 2026 No. 21 draft pick Protection from Fire during 2026 WNBA expansion draft	To Portland Fire 2026 No. 17 draft pick
April 1	To Chicago Sky Protection from Tempo during 2026 WNBA expansion draft	To Toronto Tempo 2026 No. 26 draft pick
April 6	To Chicago Sky 2027 first-round pick 2028 first-round pick	To Atlanta Dream Angel Reese; 2028 second-round pick swap
April 9	To Connecticut Sun Diamond Miller	To Dallas Wings Rayah Marshall
April 11	To Chicago Sky Jacy Sheldon	To Washington Mystics 2028 first-round pick
April 12	To Chicago Sky Rickea Jackson	To Los Angeles Sparks Ariel Atkins (sign-and-trade)
May
May 6	To Minnesota Lynx Maya Caldwell	To Portland Fire 2028 third-round pick
July
July 31	To Connecticut Sun Maria Kliundikova; 2028 second-round pick	To Toronto Tempo Aneesah Morrow
August
August 2	To Los Angeles Sparks Monique Akoa Makani; 2027 first-round pick 2028 second-round pick	To Phoenix Mercury Kelsey Plum

=== Free agency ===
Denotes uncoreable unrestricted free agent
Denotes unrestricted free agent
Denotes restricted free agent
Denotes reserved free agent
Denotes player coming off suspended contract
Denotes sign-and-trade player

^{S}	Denotes player whose contract was suspended for 2026 season
^{X}	Denotes signed player who failed to make 2026 opening-day roster
^{W}	Denotes signed player who was waived during regular season
^{R}	Denotes signed player who was released during regular season

==== Core designation ====
List of players cored during 2026 season
Date designated	Player	Cored placed by	Notes	Ref.
April 6	Kelsey Mitchell	Indiana Fever	Signed one-year deal on April 11	
April 6	Ariel Atkins	Chicago Sky	Traded to Los Angeles Sparks on April 12 (Sign-and-trade)	
April 7	Bridget Carleton	Portland Fire	Signed three-year deal on April 11	
April 7	Napheesa Collier	Minnesota Lynx		
April 7	Allisha Gray	Atlanta Dream	Signed three-year deal on April 11	
April 7	Sabrina Ionescu	New York Liberty		
April 7	Marina Mabrey	Toronto Tempo	Signed two-year deal on April 11	
April 7	Ezi Magbegor	Seattle Storm	Signed contract on April 12	
April 7	Arike Ogunbowale	Dallas Wings	Signed two-year deal on April 12	
April 7	Kelsey Plum	Los Angeles Sparks		

==== Free agents ====
List of free agents signed in the off-season (April 8–April 18)
Date signed	Player	Notes	New team	Former team	Ref.
April 7	Chloe Bibby	Training camp contract	Portland Fire		
April 7	Emily Engstler	Training camp contract	Portland Fire		
April 7	Lexi Held	Training camp contract	Toronto Tempo		
April 7	Nikolina Milić	Training camp contract	Toronto Tempo		
April 7	Madison Scott	Training camp contract	Washington Mystics		
April 8	Grace Berger	Training camp contract	Dallas Wings		
April 8	Maya Caldwell	Training camp contract	Portland Fire		
April 8	Sika Koné	Training camp contract	Atlanta Dream		
April 8	Li Yueru	Training camp contract	Dallas Wings		
April 8	Jaylyn Sherrod	Training camp contract	Minnesota Lynx		
April 9	Kierstan Bell	Training camp contract	Las Vegas Aces		
April 9	Mamignan Touré	Training camp contract	Connecticut Sun		
April 11	Julie Allemand	Two-year deal	Toronto Tempo	Los Angeles Sparks	
April 11	Elizabeth Balogun	Training camp contract	Toronto Tempo	CB Bembibre (Spain)	
April 11	Rachel Banham	Details to be announced	Chicago Sky		
April 11	Monique Billings	Details to be announced	Indiana Fever	Golden State Valkyries	
April 11	Veronica Burton	Three-year deal	Golden State Valkyries		
April 11	Jordin Canada	Two-year deal	Atlanta Dream		
April 11	María Conde	Training camp contract	Toronto Tempo		
April 11	Zia Cooke	Details to be announced	Seattle Storm		
April 11	Skylar Diggins	Two-year deal	Chicago Sky	Seattle Storm	
April 11	Brittney Griner	One-year deal	Connecticut Sun	Atlanta Dream	
April 11	Natisha Hiedeman	Two-year deal	Seattle Storm	Minnesota Lynx	
April 11	Naz Hillmon	Three-year deal	Atlanta Dream		
April 11	Mackenzie Holmes	Details to be announced	Seattle Storm		
April 11	Rhyne Howard	Details to be announced	Atlanta Dream		
April 11	Lexie Hull	Multi-year deal	Indiana Fever		
April 11	Brionna Jones	Details to be announced	Atlanta Dream		
April 11	Laura Juškaitė	Training camp contract	Toronto Tempo	Çukurova (Turkey)	
April 11	Awak Kuier	Details to be announced	Dallas Wings		
April 11	Olivia Nelson-Ododa	Two-year deal	Connecticut Sun		
April 11	Karlie Samuelson	One-year deal	Portland Fire	—	
April 11	Jessica Shepard	Multi-year deal	Dallas Wings	Minnesota Lynx	
April 11	Alanna Smith	Three-year deal	Dallas Wings	Minnesota Lynx	
April 11	Azurá Stevens	Three-year deal	Chicago Sky	Los Angeles Sparks	
April 11	Brittney Sykes	Two-year deal	Toronto Tempo	Seattle Storm	
April 11	Kristy Wallace	Training camp contract	Toronto Tempo		
April 11	Elizabeth Williams	Two-year deal	Chicago Sky		
April 12	Kennedy Burke	One-year deal	Connecticut Sun	New York Liberty	
April 12	DiJonai Carrington	One-year deal	Chicago Sky	Minnesota Lynx	
April 12	Sophie Cunningham	One-year deal	Indiana Fever		
April 12	Damiris Dantas	Two-year deal	Indiana Fever		
April 12	Dulcy Fankam Mendjiadeu	Training camp contract	Dallas Wings	Crvena zevzda (Serbia)	
April 12	Tyasha Harris	Details to be announced	Indiana Fever	Dallas Wings	
April 12	Isabelle Harrison	One-year deal	Toronto Tempo	New York Liberty	
April 12	Amy Okonkwo	Training camp contract	Dallas Wings	Beşiktaş JK (Turkey)	
April 12	Maddison Rocci	Training camp contract	Toronto Tempo	Southside Melbourne Flyers (Australia)	
April 12	Shyanne Sellers	Training camp contract	Dallas Wings	Maccabi Haifa (Israel)	
April 12	Katie Lou Samuelson	One-year deal	Seattle Storm		
April 12	Courtney Vandersloot	Two-year deal	Chicago Sky		
April 12	Costanza Verona	Rookie scale contract	Dallas Wings	Famila Schio (Italy)	
April 13	Sydney Taylor	Training camp contract	Chicago Sky	Zagłębie Sosnowiec (Poland)	
April 14	Megan Nestor	Training camp contract	Chicago Sky	North Texas Mean Green	
April 16	Sidney Cooks	Training camp contract	Chicago Sky	San Martino (Italy)	
April 17	Jordan Hobbs	Training camp contract	Chicago Sky	Shaanxi Red Wolves (China)	

List of free agents signed during training camp / preseason (April 19–May 7)
Date signed	Player	Notes	New team	Former team	Ref.

==== Training camp / preseason ====
List of players waived during training camp / preseason (April 19–May 7) (Note: Players listed in alphabetical order.)
Atlanta Dream	Chicago Sky	Connecticut Sun	Dallas Wings	Golden State Valkyries
Indiana Fever	Las Vegas Aces	Los Angeles Sparks	Minnesota Lynx	New York Liberty
Phoenix Mercury	Portland Fire	Seattle Storm	Toronto Tempo	Washington Mystics

=== Contract suspensions ===
List of players suspended during 2026 season
Date Suspended	Player	Reason	Date Set as Active	Team with Player Rights	Ref.
January 21, 2021	María Conde	Contract expired	April 11, 2026	Toronto Tempo	
January 16, 2022	Maite Cazorla	Contract expired	—	Atlanta Dream	
February 18, 2022	Klara Holm	Contract expired	–	Phoenix Mercury	
September 10, 2023	Han Xu	Suspended contract – temporary	—	New York Liberty	
January 22, 2024	Awak Kuier	Personal decision	April 11, 2026	Dallas Wings	
February 24, 2025	Lou Lopez Sénéchal	Personal decision – full season	—	Dallas Wings	
February 25, 2025	Kristy Wallace	Personal decision – full season	April 11, 2026	Toronto Tempo	
April 7, 2025	Holly Winterburn	Personal decision / injury – full season	—	Atlanta Dream	
April 17, 2025	Jordan Horston	Injury – full season	—	Seattle Storm	
April 17, 2025	Nika Mühl	Injury – full season	—	Portland Fire	
April 21, 2025	Raquel Carrera	Personal decision – full season	—	New York Liberty	i
April 25, 2025	Julia Ayrault	Personal decision – full season	—	Phoenix Mercury	
May 9, 2025	Helena Pueyo	Personal decision – full season	—	Phoenix Mercury	
May 10, 2025	Dorka Juhász	Personal decision – full season	—	Minnesota Lynx	
May 14, 2025	Betnijah Laney-Hamilton	Non-WNBA injury – full season	—	New York Liberty	

=== Inactive players ===
List of players set as inactive during the 2026 season
Date Set Inactive	Player	Reason	Date Activated	Team	Ref.

=== Offers ===
List of players receiving offers during 2026 season
Date Offered	Player	Team Providing Offer	Notes	Ref.
April 6	Sevgi Uzun	Chicago Sky	Reserved qualifying offer Offer rescinded on April 16	

=== Rights renounced ===
List of WNBA players whose rights were renounced in 2025 offseason or 2026 regular season
Date Renounced	Player	Team	Ref.
April 5, 2026	Matilde Villa	Atlanta Dream	
April 5, 2026	Ivana Dojkić	New York Liberty	
April 5, 2026	Seehia Ridard	New York Liberty	
April 5, 2026	Annika Soltau	New York Liberty	

== Draft ==
The 2026 draft will take place on April 13, 2026.

*	Denotes player who has been selected for at least one All-Star Game and All-WNBA Team
^{#}	Denotes player who never played in the WNBA regular season or playoffs
**Bold**	Denotes player who won Rookie of the Year

=== First round ===
Pick	Player	Nationality	Team	School / club team
1	Azzi Fudd	United States	Dallas Wings	UConn
2	**Olivia Miles**^{*}	United States	Minnesota Lynx (from Chicago) (Note: April 13, 2025: Chicago to Minnesota: Minnesota acquired the outright 2026 first-round draft pick and extinguished the previous right to exchange 2026 first-round draft picks with Chicago; Chicago acquired the 2025 No. 11 draft pick (Hailey Van Lith))	TCU
3	Awa Fam	Spain/Senegal	Seattle Storm (from Los Angeles) (Note: January 31, 2024: Seattle to Los Angeles: Los Angeles acquired Kia Nurse and a 2024 first-round pick (Rickea Jackson); Seattle acquired a 2026 first-round pick)	Valencia (Spain)
4	Lauren Betts	United States	Washington Mystics	UCLA
5	Gabriela Jaquez	United States/Mexico	Chicago Sky (from Connecticut) (Note: July 17, 2024: Connecticut to Chicago: Chicago acquired Rachel Banham, Moriah Jefferson, a 2025 first-round pick (Ajša Sivka), and the right to swap 2026 first-round picks; Connecticut acquired Marina Mabrey and a 2025 second-round pick (Rayah Marshall))	UCLA
6	Kiki Rice	United States	Toronto Tempo	UCLA
7	Iyana Martín	Spain	Portland Fire	Perfumerias Avenida (Spain)
8	Flau'jae Johnson	United States	Golden State Valkyries (Traded to Seattle)	LSU
9	Angela Dugalić	United States/Serbia	Washington Mystics (from Seattle) (Note: August 5, 2025: Seattle to Washington: Seattle acquired Brittney Sykes; Washington acquired Alysha Clark, Zia Cooke, and a 2026 first-round pick)	UCLA
10	Raven Johnson	United States	Indiana Fever	South Carolina
11	Cotie McMahon	United States	Washington Mystics (from New York via Minnesota and Connecticut) (Note: March 16, 2025: New York to Connecticut: Connecticut acquired the 2025 No. 7 draft pick (Aneesah Morrow) and a 2026 first-round pick; New York acquired Natasha Cloud) (Note: April 14, 2025: Minnesota to Washington: Washington acquired 2026 first-round pick; Minnesota acquired Karlie Samuelson) (Note: August 7, 2025: Connecticut to Washington: Washington acquired Jacy Sheldon and the right to swap 2026 first-round picks (Washington with Minnesota's own and Connecticut with New York's own acquired from prior trades); Connecticut acquired Aaliyah Edwards)	Ole Miss
12	Nell Angloma	France	Connecticut Sun (from Phoenix via Chicago) (Note: February 6, 2024: Phoenix to Chicago: Phoenix acquired Kahleah Copper and Morgan Bertsch; Chicago acquired Brianna Turner, Michaela Onyenwere, a 2024 first-round pick (Kamilla Cardoso), the Sky's own 2025 second-round pick, a 2026 first-round pick, and the right to swap 2026 second-round picks with Phoenix)	Basket Lattes Montpellier (France)
13	Madina Okot	Kenya	Atlanta Dream	South Carolina
14	Taina Mair	United States	Seattle Storm (from Las Vegas) (Note: February 1, 2025: Three-team trade among Las Vegas, Los Angeles, and Seattle: Las Vegas acquired Jewell Loyd (from Seattle) and a 2025 second-round pick (Aaliyah Nye, from Los Angeles); Los Angeles acquired Kelsey Plum (from Las Vegas), a 2025 first-round (Sarah Ashlee Barker) and a 2026 second-round pick (from Seattle); Seattle acquired the rights to Li Yueru and a 2025 first-round pick (Dominique Malonga, from Los Angeles), and a 2026 first-round pick (from Las Vegas))	Duke
15	Gianna Kneepkens	United States	Connecticut Sun (from Minnesota via Washington)	UCLA

=== Second round ===
Pick	Player	Nationality	Team	School / club team
16	Marta Suárez	Spain	Seattle Storm (from Dallas, traded to Golden State) (Note: June 14, 2025: Dallas to Seattle: Dallas acquired Li Yueru; Seattle acquired a 2026 second-round pick (with right to swap with the Connecticut Sun) and a 2027 third-round pick (with right to swap with the Indiana Fever))	TCU
17	Frieda Bühner	Germany	Portland Fire (from Chicago) (Note: April 1, 2026: Chicago to Portland: Chicago acquired the 2026 21st pick and complete protection from the Fire in the 2026 WNBA expansion draft; Portland acquired the 2026 17th pick)	Estudiantes (Spain)
18	Charlisse Leger-Walker	New Zealand	Connecticut Sun	UCLA
19	Cassandre Prosper	Canada	Washington Mystics	Notre Dame
20	Ta'Niya Latson	United States	Los Angeles Sparks	South Carolina
21	Latasha Lattimore	Canada	Chicago Sky (from Portland)	Ole Miss
22	Teonni Key	United States	Toronto Tempo	Kentucky
23	Ashlon Jackson	United States	Golden State Valkyries	Duke
24	Chance Gray	United States	Los Angeles Sparks (from Seattle)	Ohio State
25	Justine Pissott	United States	Indiana Fever	Vanderbilt
26	Saffron Shiels	Australia	Toronto Tempo (from New York via Chicago) (Note: April 1, 2026: Chicago to Portland: Chicago acquired complete protection from the Tempo in the 2026 WNBA expansion draft; Tempo acquired the 2026 26th pick) (Note: March 14, 2024: New York to Chicago: New York acquired Rebekah Gardner; Chicago acquired 2025 and 2026 second-round picks)	Townsville Fire (Australia)
27	Inès Pitarch-Granel	France	Phoenix Mercury	Tango Bourges (France)
28	Indya Nivar	United States	Atlanta Dream	North Carolina
29	Janiah Barker	United States	Las Vegas Aces	Tennessee
30	Darianna Littlepage-Buggs	United States	Washington Mystics (from Minnesota) (Note: August 20, 2024: Minnesota to Washington: Minnesota acquired Myisha Hines-Allen; Washington acquired Olivia Époupa, Sika Koné, and a 2026 second-round pick)	Baylor

=== Third round ===
Pick	Player	Nationality	Team	School / club team
31	Zee Spearman	United States	Dallas Wings	Tennessee
32	Tonie Morgan	United States	Chicago Sky	Kentucky
33	Serah Williams	United States	Connecticut Sun	UConn
34	Rori Harmon	United States	Washington Mystics	Texas
35	Amelia Hassett	Australia	Los Angeles Sparks	Kentucky
36	Charlise Dunn	Australia	Toronto Tempo	Davidson
37	Taylor Bigby	United States	Portland Fire	TCU
38	Kokoro Tanaka	Japan	Golden State Valkyries	Eneos Sunflowers (Japan)
39	Grace VanSlooten	United States	Seattle Storm	Michigan State
40	Jessica Timmons	United States	Indiana Fever	Alabama
41	Manuela Puoch	Australia	New York Liberty	Southside Melbourne Flyers (Australia)
42	Eszter Rátkai	Hungary	Phoenix Mercury	PEAC (Hungary)
43	Ran Kejia	China	Atlanta Dream	Sichuan Yuanda (China)
44	Jordan Obi	United States	Las Vegas Aces	Kentucky
45	Lani White	United States	Minnesota Lynx	Utah

=== Previous years' unsigned draftees ===
List of previously unsigned draftees under contract for 2026 season
Date Signed to Rookie Contract	Player	Draft	Pick	Team	Previous Team	Outcome	Ref.
April 12	Isobel Borlase ^{#}	2024	20	Atlanta Dream	Bendigo Spirit (Australia)	Signed rookie contract on April 12	
April 13	Aicha Coulibaly ^{#}	2025	22	Chicago Sky	Texas A&M Aggies (NCAA)	Signed rookie contract on April 13	
