= List of WNBA Mascots =

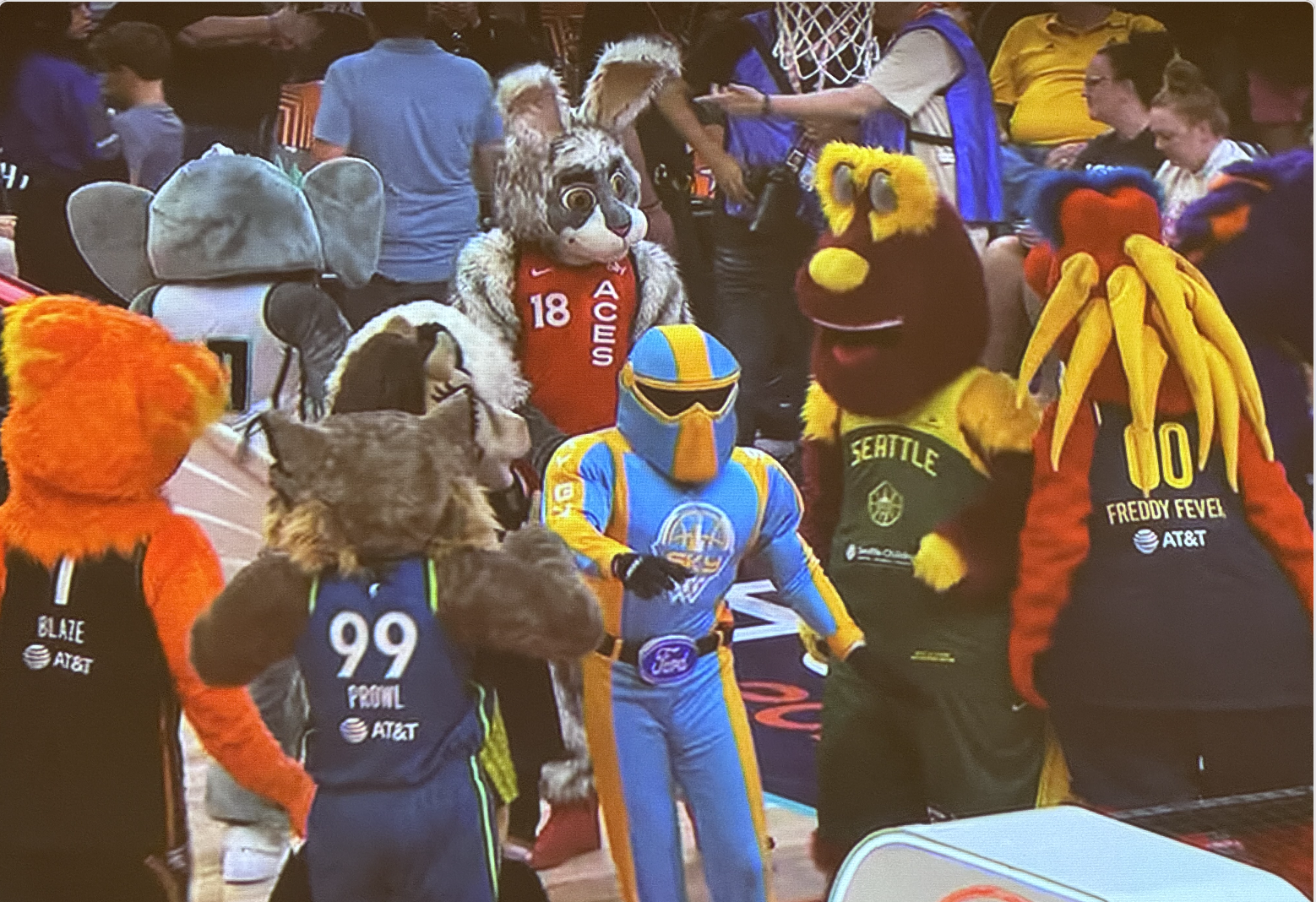
WNBA Mascots at the 2024 WNBA Skills Challenge

This is a list of Current WNBA Mascots in alphabetical order:

- Connecticut Sun Blaze
- Las Vegas Aces Bucket$
- Toronto Tempo Dez and Dot
- Seattle Storm Doppler
- New York Liberty Ellie the Elephant
- Indiana Fever Freddy Fever
- Dallas Wings Lightning
- Washington Mystics Pax
- Minnesota Lynx Prowl
- Phoenix Mercury Scorch
- Chicago Sky Skye the Lioness (formerly known as Sky Guy)
- Los Angeles Sparks Sparky
- Golden State Valkyries Violet
- Portland Fire Rose the Dragon

- Note that the Atlanta Dream's Star retired in 2020 and has not been replaced yet

== See also ==
- List of mascots
