= Dez and Dot =

Toronto Tempo mascots

Dez and Dot are the mascots for the Toronto Tempo. The former is a turtle and the latter is a hare.

== See also ==
- List of WNBA Mascots
