= Vanja Černivec =

Slovenian basketball executive

Portland Fire
- Position: General manager
- League: WNBA

Personal information
- Born: March 7, 1982 (age 44)
- Listed height: 5 ft 9 in (1.75 m)

Career history
- 2023–24: London Lions (General manager)
- 2024–25: Golden State Valkyries (Vice president of basketball operations)
- 2025–present: Portland Fire (General manager)

Vanja Černivec (born March 7, 1982) is a Slovenian basketball executive who is general manager of the WNBA's Portland Fire.

== Early life and education ==
Vanja Černivec is originally from Slovenia. Černivec holds a Bachelor of Arts degree in international relations from the University of Ljubljana and a Master of Science degree in sports marketing and communications from Euroleague Basketball Institute and Ca’ Foscari University of Venice.

== Career ==
Černivec spent six years working with the NBA internationally, focusing on talent identification and recruitment across Europe, the Middle East, and Africa for the NBA Academy Women’s Program, and also served as technical director for all regional and global camps with the NBA’s Basketball Without Borders platform. From 2020 to 2022, she was the Chicago Bulls’ first female international scout.

Černivec began working for the London Lions of the Super League Basketball, serving two seasons as General Manager. She oversaw all basketball operations and helped build a championship program that captured the club’s first FIBA EuroCup Women’s championship, as well as back-to-back Women’s British Basketball League championships in 2023 and 2024.

=== Portland Fire ===
In August 2025, Černivec was named the inaugural general manager of the Portland Fire and began working for the team on September 15, 2025.
