= Rose (mascot) =

Portland Thorns mascot

- Team: Portland Fire
- Origin of name: "Rose City" (one of Portland's nicknames)
- First seen: August 23, 2026

Rose is the mascot for the Portland Fire. She is a glitter-breathing pink dragon who made her debut appearance on August 23, 2026.

== Description ==
Rose is a glitter-breathing dragon with wings, named after one of Portland's nicknames ("Rose City"). She is pink and has rose-inspired scales. Rose wears a rose crown and her tail lights up. She also has custom pink Nike Air Force 1s. Rose has blue nails and a "fierce" attitude, according to KOIN. On social media, she is described as the "baddie of the Portland Fire". Rose is said to have lived under the Rose Quarter and was awakened by the return of the Portland Fire.

According to Stephanie Kaloi of the Portland Mercury, "There are important things to know about Rose, and the top of the list might be that she has a strong affinity for Rihanna. She also carries a pink bag and sports My Little Pony-esque large blue eyes; her energy is light and effervescent, and her dragon lair is hospitable to fans."

== History ==
Rose was introduced during halftime at a game against the Washington Mystics on August 23, 2026, following a series of glitter trails and scorch marks around the city. Marks resembling the team's logo appeared at multiple local businesses and other sites, including the Oregon Museum of Science and Industry and Powell's Books, as well as the Nike World Headquarters near Beaverton. On the day of her unveiling, a mark appeared outside the Moda Center, the team's home stadium. The Portland Fire collaborated with the Pantone Color Institute to develop Rose Pink specifically for the mascot.

== See also ==
- Lists of dragons
  - List of dragons in popular culture
- List of WNBA Mascots
- Roses in Portland, Oregon
