= Maya Caldwell =

American basketball player (born 1998)

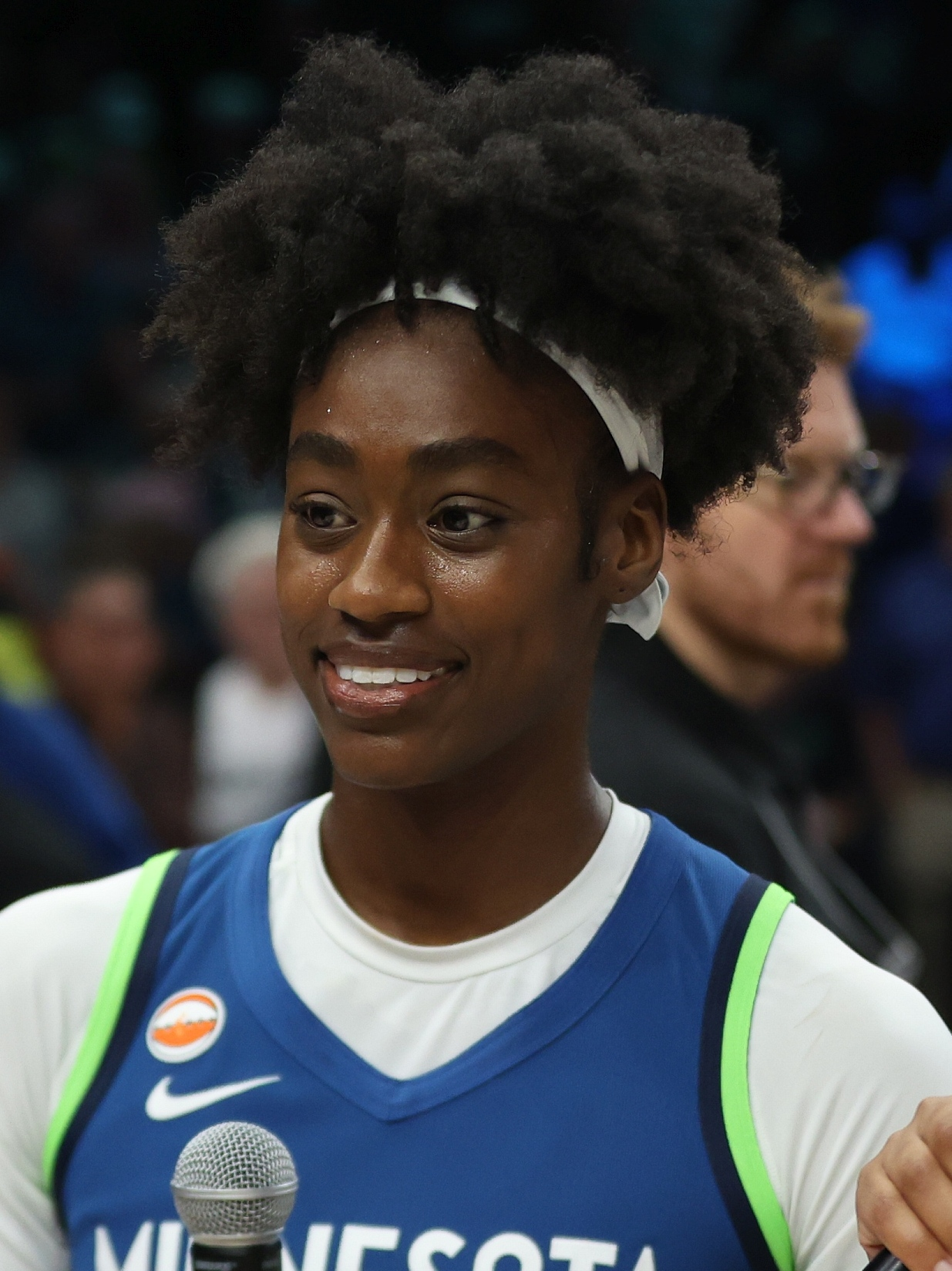
- Caldwell with the Minnesota Lynx in 2026

No. 3 – Minnesota Lynx
- Position: Guard
- League: WNBA

Personal information
- Born: December 15, 1998 (age 27) Charlotte, North Carolina, U.S.
- Listed height: 5 ft 11 in (1.80 m)
- Listed weight: 159 lb (72 kg)

Career information
- High school: Davidson Day School (Davidson, North Carolina)
- College: Georgia (2017–2021)
- WNBA draft: 2021: 3rd round, 33rd overall pick
- Drafted by: Indiana Fever
- Playing career: 2021–present

Career history
- 2021–2022: Spar Gran Canaria
- 2022: Atlanta Dream
- 2022: Maccabi Ironi Ramat Gan
- 2023: Indiana Fever
- 2023: Bogazici Basketbol Bursa
- 2024–2025: Atlanta Dream
- 2024–2025: Uni Girona CB
- 2026–present: Minnesota Lynx
- Stats at Basketball Reference

Maya Denise Caldwell (born December 15, 1998) is an American professional basketball player for the Minnesota Lynx of the Women's National Basketball Association (WNBA). She played college basketball at Georgia.

== College career ==
Caldwell came out of high school as the 76th overall ranked recruit according to the ESPN HoopGurlz Rankings. Caldwell committed to Georgia to play collegiately. She stated that part of the reason for choosing the Bulldogs program was that "Athens just felt like home...If I didn't have basketball, where would I want to be?' Athens was the place."

Caldwell played in all 33 games as a freshman and led the team in 3-point field goal percentage. She scored a season high 20 points against Howard on December 19, 2017. With those 20 points, she became the first Bulldog player to score 20 points as a freshman since 2014. During her sophomore season, Caldwell came off the bench again until the last 10 games of the season – when she became the team's starting forward. Once inserted into the starting lineup, Caldwell increased her scoring to 9.0 ppg from 3.4 ppg.

During her junior and senior seasons, Caldwell stayed in the starting lineup and became a solid, consistent player for Georgia. During her senior season, Caldwell scored a career high 27 points against Florida. She was also named to the SEC All-Tournament Team in 2021.

== Professional career ==
=== WNBA ===
==== Indiana Fever ====
In the 2021 WNBA draft, Caldwell was taken 33rd overall by the Indiana Fever. Caldwell made it through a week of training camp before getting cut from the Fever.

==== Atlanta Dream ====
On February 23, 2022, Caldwell signed a training camp contract with the Atlanta Dream. On May 5, 2022, Caldwell was waived from the Dream training camp. On June 20, 2022, Caldwell was brought back to the Dream on a hardship contract. After appearing in 3 games for the Dream, Caldwell was released from her Hardship Contract on June 27, 2022. The Dream re-signed Caldwell on June 26, 2024.

==== Portland Fire ====
On April 3, 2026, she was drafted ninth overall by the Portland Fire in the 2026 WNBA expansion draft.

==== Minnesota Lynx ====
On May 6, 2026, she was traded from the Portland Fire to the Minnesota Lynx, in exchange for their 2028 third round draft pick. She was named the Sylvia Fowles Altruism Award winner for the team's 2026 season, as selected by team staff and players.

=== Overseas ===
==== Gran Canaria ====
Caldwell played the 2021–2022 season in Spain for Spar Gran Canaria. She averaged 15.5 points, 5.1 rebounds, 1.8 assists, and 1.5 steals in 26 games for them.

== Career statistics ==
Legend
| GP | Games played | GS | Games started | MPG | Minutes per game | RPG | Rebounds per game |
| APG | Assists per game | SPG | Steals per game | BPG | Blocks per game | PPG | Points per game |
| TO | Turnovers per game | FG% | Field-goal percentage | 3P% | 3-point field-goal percentage | FT% | Free-throw percentage |
| **Bold** | Career best | ° | League leader |

=== WNBA ===
==== Regular season ====
WNBA regular season statistics
| Year | Team | GP | GS | MPG | FG% | 3P% | FT% | RPG | APG | SPG | BPG | TO | PPG |
|---|---|---|---|---|---|---|---|---|---|---|---|---|---|
| 2021 | Did not play (waived) | | | | | | | | | | | | |
| 2022 | Atlanta | 9 | 7 | **23.8** | **.514** | **.563** | .800 | 2.4 | **2.2** | .8 | **.2** | 1.6 | **10.9** |
| 2023 | Indiana | 30 | 1 | 10.1 | .292 | .138 | **.857** | .9 | .6 | .3 | .1 | **.7** | 1.9 |
| 2024 | Atlanta | 25 | 6 | 16.2 | .416 | .300 | .800 | 1.8 | 1.1 | .6 | **.2** | .9 | 5.2 |
| 2025 | Atlanta | 41 | **16** | 18.5 | .426 | .355 | .800 | **3.1** | 1.8 | **.9** | **.2** | 1.0 | 5.4 |
| 2026 | Minnesota | **44**° | 5 | 14.3 | .371 | .365 | .815 | 2.4 | 1.1 | .6 | **.2** | **.7** | 4.1 |
| **Career** | 5 years, 3 teams | 149 | 35 | 15.5 | .404 | .350 | .815 | 2.2 | 1.3 | .6 | .2 | .9 | 4.6 |

==== Playoffs ====
WNBA playoff statistics
| Year | Team | GP | GS | MPG | FG% | 3P% | FT% | RPG | APG | SPG | BPG | TO | PPG |
|---|---|---|---|---|---|---|---|---|---|---|---|---|---|
| 2024 | Atlanta | 2 | 0 | 9.0 | .250 | .000 | — | 1.5 | 1.0 | **1.0** | **.5** | **.0** | 1.0 |
| 2025 | Atlanta | **3** | 0 | **13.3** | **.429** | **.333** | — | **2.0** | .7 | .3 | .3 | 1.3 | **2.3** |
| 2026 | Minnesota | 2 | 0 | 10.5 | .000 | .000 | — | 1.5 | **1.5** | **1.0** | .0 | .5 | .0 |
| **Career** | 3 years, 2 teams | 7 | 0 | 11.3 | .333 | .167 | — | 1.7 | 1.0 | .7 | .3 | .7 | 1.3 |

=== College ===
NCAA statistics
| Year | Team | GP | Points | FG% | 3P% | FT% | RPG | APG | SPG | BPG | PPG |
|---|---|---|---|---|---|---|---|---|---|---|---|
| 2017–18 | Georgia | **33** | 142 | .417 | **.404** | .600 | 2.1 | .6 | .3 | .1 | 4.2 |
| 2018–19 | Georgia | 30 | 161 | **.429** | .216 | .520 | 3.0 | 1.1 | .9 | **.3** | 5.4 |
| 2019–20 | Georgia | 31 | **303** | .414 | .269 | **.792** | **3.7** | **2.2** | **1.4** | .2 | **9.8** |
| 2020–21 | Georgia | 28 | 232 | .401 | .309 | .787 | 3.6 | 1.9 | .9 | **.3** | 8.3 |
