= Jordan Harrison (basketball) =

American basketball player (born 2004)

Personal information
- Born: April 26, 2004 (age 22)
- Listed height: 5 ft 6 in (1.68 m)

Career information
- High school: Classen School of Advanced Studies (Oklahoma City, Oklahoma)
- College: Stephen F. Austin (2022–2023); West Virginia (2023–2026)
- WNBA draft: 2026: undrafted
- Position: Guard
- Number: 2

Career history
- 2026: Portland Fire
- Stats at WNBA.com
- Stats at Basketball Reference

Jordan Harrison (born April 26, 2004) is an American former professional basketball player for the Portland Fire of the Women's National Basketball Association (WNBA). She played college basketball for the Stephen F. Austin Ladyjacks and West Virginia Mountaineers. On September 29th, 2026, she announced her retirement from basketball.

== Early life ==
Harrison was born on April 26, 2004. She grew up in Oklahoma City, Oklahoma, and attended the Classen School of Advanced Studies there where she played basketball. Harrison was the All City Athletic Conference Girls Player of the Year in 2020 and averaged 11.6 points, 4.0 assists, 3.2 steals and 3.0 rebounds per game in high school. While at Classen, she set a state record with 74 points in a game. After high school, she decided to play college basketball for the Stephen F. Austin Ladyjacks.

== College career ==
Harrison averaged 12.1 points and 5.0 assists per game as a freshman at Stephen F. Austin in 2022–23, being named the Western Athletic Conference (WAC) Freshman of the Year. She then transferred to the West Virginia Mountaineers in 2023–24, averaging 13.5 points and 5.2 assists that year while being named second-team All-Big 12 Conference and to the Big 12 All-Defensive team. She was named third-team All-Big 12 in 2024–25 after averaging 13.7 points. Harrison started all 33 games in both the 2023–24 and 2024–25 seasons. As a senior in 2025–26, she helped West Virginia to the Big 12 tournament championship and an appearance in the NCAA Tournament. She averaged 13.9 points and 5.2 assists per game, earning first-team All-Big 12 honors and selection to the All-Big 12 Defensive team, while also being named the Big 12 Defensive Player of the Year, an honorable mention All-American and a finalist for the Naismith College Player of the Year award.

== Professional career ==
After going unselected in the 2026 WNBA draft, Harrison signed a training camp contract with the Portland Fire. She made the team's opening day roster.

On Monday, September 28, 2026, Harrison announced her decision to step away from a basketball career on her Instagram account.
