= Taina Mair =

American basketball player (born 2003)

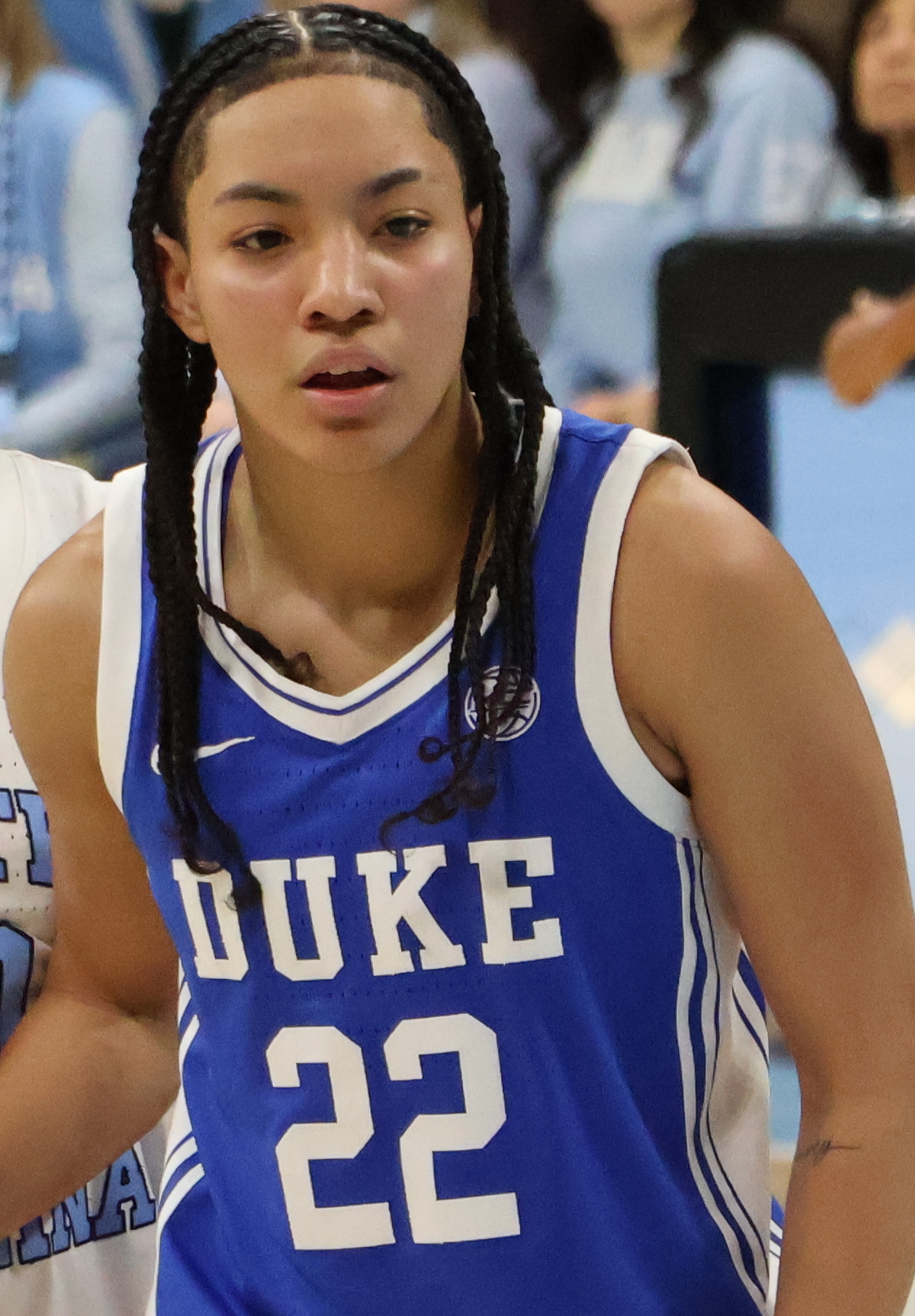
- Mair with Duke in 2025

No. 22 – AZS AJP Gorzów Wielkopolski
- Position: Guard
- League: Basket Liga Kobiet

Personal information
- Born: November 20, 2003 (age 22)
- Listed height: 5 ft 9 in (1.75 m)

Career information
- High school: Brooks School (North Andover, Massachusetts)
- College: Boston College (2022–2023); Duke (2023–2026)
- WNBA draft: 2026: 1st round, 14th overall pick
- Drafted by: Seattle Storm
- Playing career: 2026–present

Career history
- 2026: Seattle Storm
- 2026–present: AZS AJP Gorzów Wielkopolski
- Stats at Basketball Reference

Taina Mair (born November 20, 2003) is an American professional basketball player for the AZS AJP Gorzów Wielkopolski of the Basket Liga Kobiet. She played college basketball for the Boston College Eagles and Duke Blue Devils and was selected in the first round of the 2026 WNBA draft.

== Early life ==
Mair grew up in Dorchester, Boston, Massachusetts. She grew up playing basketball and attended Holderness School in New Hampshire in ninth grade before transferring to Brooks School in North Andover. She helped Holderness to a NEPSAC Class D championship as a freshman and then as a sophomore and senior at Brooks won Class B titles. Mair was the NEPSAC Class B Player of the Year as a sophomore and later was the Gatorade Massachusetts Girls' Player of the Year as a senior. She averaged 24.5 points, 11 rebounds and 11 assists per game as a senior and led Brooks to an undefeated record of 24–0, making the game-winning score in the final seconds of the Class B championship. She committed to play college basketball for the Boston College Eagles.

== College career ==
Mair became a starter at Boston College as a freshman in 2022–23. She started all 33 games and set the team record for assists by a freshman, with 217. She averaged 11.1 points, 4.7 rebounds and 6.6 assists, earning selection to the Atlantic Coast Conference (ACC) All-Freshman team. After the season, she transferred to the Duke Blue Devils. Mair started all 34 games during the 2023–24 season, averaging 9.8 points, 3.8 rebounds and 3.7 assists, then started all 37 games in 2024–25 with averages of 6.7 points, 3.6 assists and 3.0 rebounds per game. As a senior in 2025–26, Mair was named first-team All-ACC and to the ACC All-Defensive team while averaging 11.6 points, 5.9 rebounds and 5.6 assists, helping Duke to the Elite Eight of the NCAA Tournament.

On September 15, 2026, Mair was announced to be joining AZS AJP Gorzów Wielkopolski in Poland.

== Professional career ==
Mair was selected by the Seattle Storm in the first round, with the 14th pick, of the 2026 WNBA draft.

== Career statistics ==
Legend
| GP | Games played | GS | Games started | MPG | Minutes per game | RPG | Rebounds per game |
| APG | Assists per game | SPG | Steals per game | BPG | Blocks per game | PPG | Points per game |
| TO | Turnovers per game | FG% | Field-goal percentage | 3P% | 3-point field-goal percentage | FT% | Free-throw percentage |
| **Bold** | Career best | ° | League leader |

=== College ===
| Year | Team | GP | GS | MPG | FG% | 3P% | FT% | RPG | APG | SPG | BPG | TO | PPG |
|---|---|---|---|---|---|---|---|---|---|---|---|---|---|
| 2022–23 | Boston College | 33 | 33 | **36.6** | 36.0 | 29.4 | 78.8 | 4.7 | **6.6** | 2.0 | 0.1 | 4.2 | 11.1 |
| 2023–24 | Duke | 34 | 34 | 31.1 | 37.5 | 28.5 | **87.5** | 3.8 | 3.6 | 1.5 | **0.2** | 2.6 | 9.8 |
| 2024–25 | Duke | **37** | **37** | 24.5 | **41.6** | **37.8** | 68.8 | 3.0 | 3.6 | 1.5 | **0.2** | **2.0** | 6.7 |
| 2025–26 | Duke | 36 | 36 | 33.9 | 41.1 | 34.1 | 87.0 | **5.9** | 5.6 | **2.5** | 0.1 | 2.7 | **11.6** |
| **Career** | | 140 | 140 | 31.4 | 38.9 | 31.8 | 83.1 | 4.4 | 4.8 | 1.9 | 0.1 | 2.8 | 9.8 |
Statistics retrieved from Sports-Reference.
