= Alex Sarama =

British basketball coach (born 1995)

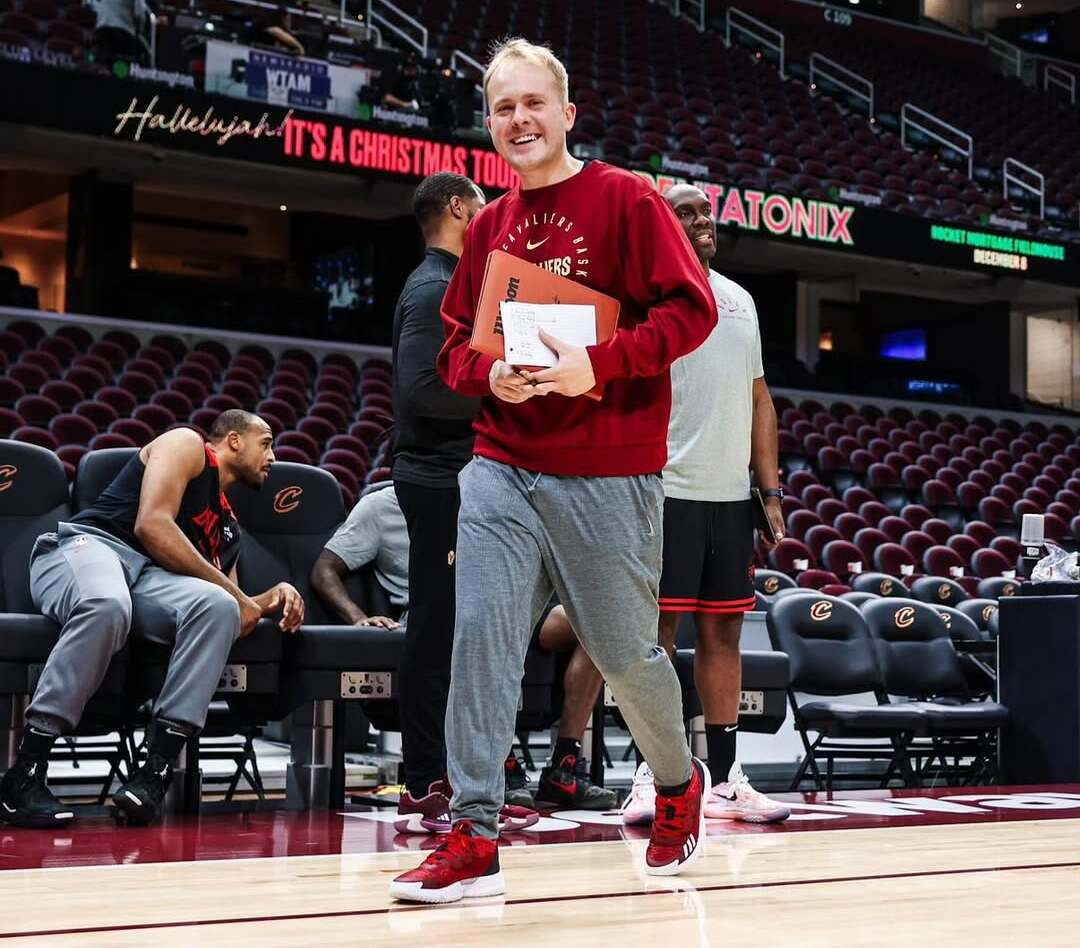
- Sarama as assistant coach for the Cleveland Cavaliers in 2025

Portland Fire
- Position: Head coach
- League: WNBA

Personal information
- Born: 21 July 1995 (age 31) Guildford, Surrey, England
- Coaching career: 2020–present

Career history

Coaching
- 2020–2023: College Basket Borgomanero
- 2022–2023: Paris Basketball (player improvement specialist)
- 2023–2024: London Lions
- 2023–2024: Rip City Remix (assistant)
- 2024–2026: Cleveland Cavaliers (assistant)
- 2026–present: Portland Fire

Alex Sarama (/ˈsɑːrəmə/; born 21 July 1995) is a British basketball coach. He is the head coach of the Portland Fire, an expansion franchise in the Women's National Basketball Association which debuted in 2026. Sarama is associated with the application of skill acquisition concepts and the constraints-led approach in basketball.

== Early life and education ==
Alex Sarama is originally from Guildford, England, where he attended St Peter's Catholic School. He started coaching basketball as a teenager and later founded the Guildford Goldhawks, a youth basketball club.

== Career ==
Sarama joined NBA Europe and worked with the league's office in Madrid. From 2020 to 2023, Sarama served as head coach of Pallacanestro College Basket Borgomanero in Italy. During this period, he implemented training and player development methods motivated by contemporary skill acquisition research.

He worked as director of methodology for the London Lions of the British Basketball League after his time at College Basket in Italy. Alongside his role with the London Lions, Sarama joined the Rip City Remix, the NBA G League affiliate of the Portland Trail Blazers, for the 2023–24 season as assistant coach and director of player development.

In 2024, he joined the Cleveland Cavaliers of the NBA as assistant coach and director of player development, supporting head coach Kenny Atkinson. During the 2024–25 regular season, the Cavaliers finished with a 64–18 record and secured No. 1 seed in the Eastern Conference.

=== Portland Fire ===
In October 2025, Sarama was named the first head coach of the revived iteration of the Portland Fire, an expansion franchise in the WNBA set to debut in the 2026 season. He officially joined the team for the 2026 WNBA expansion draft.

He has published a book, Transforming Basketball: Changing How We Think About Basketball Performance, released in 2024.

== Coaching philosophy ==
Sarama is an advocate of the Constraints-Led Approach (CLA) to skill acquisition and practice design, a methodology that emphasises decision-making, adaptability and game-representative learning environments rather than isolated and repetitive drills. When he was working for the Cleveland Cavaliers under head coach Kenny Atkinson, Sarama contributed to practice design and development frameworks. Atkinson said that the organisation aimed to "get ahead of the league" in areas such as player development and methodology, with Sarama's appointment forming part of that direction.

== See also ==
- EuroCup Basketball
- Kenny Atkinson
- Portland Trail Blazers
- Will Weaver
