= Serah Williams =

American basketball player (born 2004)

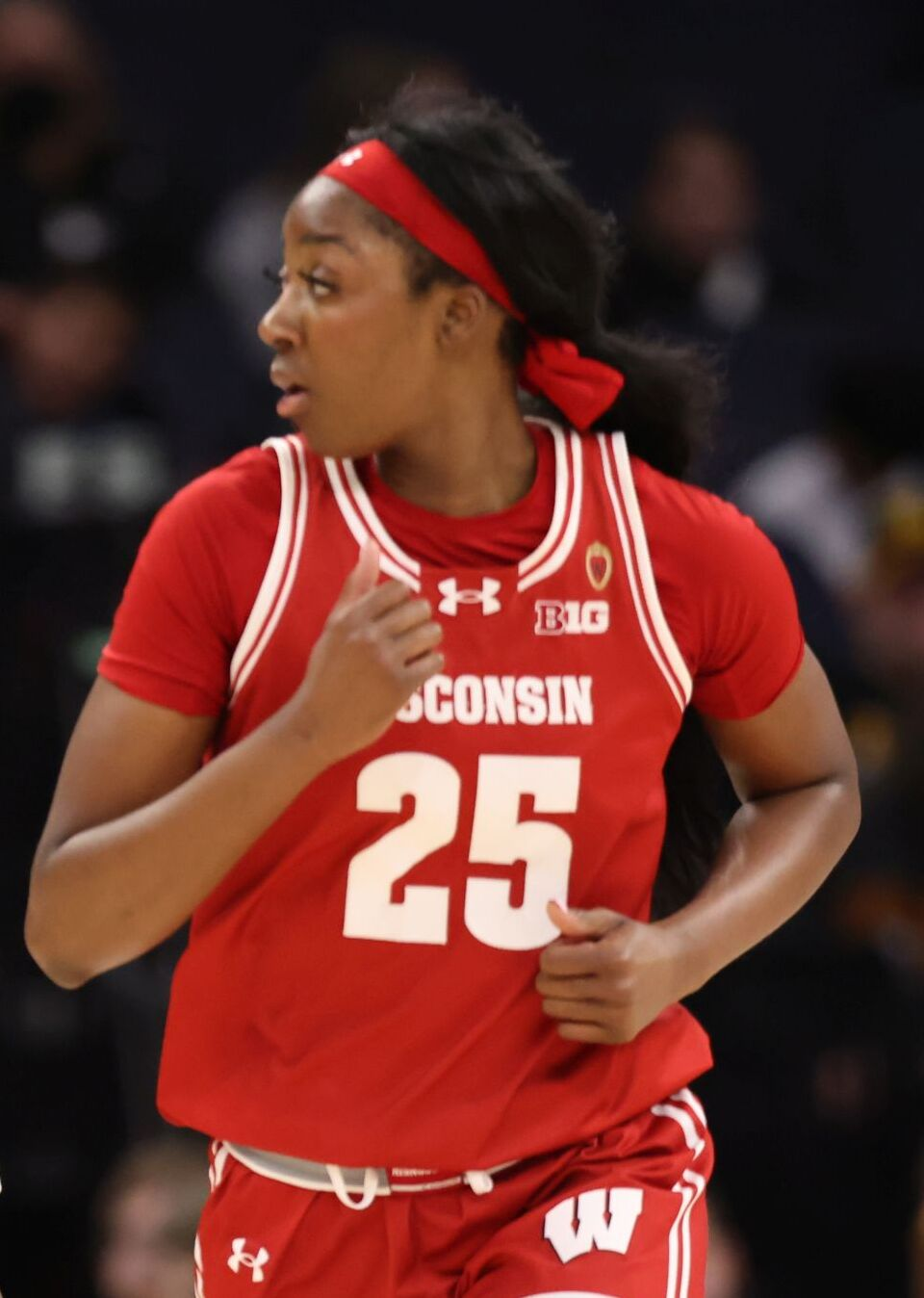
- Williams with Wisconsin in 2024

Wisła Kraków
- Position: Forward
- League: Basket Liga Kobiet

Personal information
- Born: January 17, 2004 (age 22) Brooklyn, New York, U.S.
- Listed height: 6 ft 4 in (1.93 m)
- Listed weight: 185 lb (84 kg)

Career information
- High school: Niagara Prep (Niagara Falls, Ontario)
- College: Wisconsin (2022–2025): UConn (2025–2026)
- WNBA draft: 2026: 3rd round, 33rd overall pick
- Drafted by: Connecticut Sun
- Playing career: 2026–present

Career history
- 2026: Portland Fire
- 2026–present: Wisła Kraków

Career highlights
- 2× First-team All-Big Ten (2024, 2025); Big Ten Defensive Player of the Year – Media (2024); 2× Big Ten All-Defensive Team (2024, 2025); Big Ten All-Freshman Team (2023)
- Stats at Basketball Reference
Medals
Representing United States
Women's 3x3 basketball
World Cup
Gold medal – first place	2026 Warsaw	Team

Serah Williams (born January 17, 2004) is an American professional basketball player for Wisła Kraków of the Basket Liga Kobiet. She played college basketball for the Wisconsin Badgers women's basketball and UConn Huskies.

== Early life and high school career ==
Williams moved to Toronto from Brooklyn in 2018. Williams led the Ontario Scholastic Basketball Association (OSBA) in blocks in 2019–20. In her senior year campaign in high school, Williams averaged 18.1 points, 14 rebounds, 2.9 blocks and 2.0 steals per game. Williams participated in the 2022 All-Canadian All-Star Game (top 24 student-athletes in Canada) and also made the 2022 OSBA First-Team All-Star.

On October 14, 2021, Williams announced that she committed to play college basketball for Wisconsin Badgers becoming the fourth member of coach Marisa Moseley’s first recruiting class.

== College career ==
In her freshman year, Williams made the Big Ten All Freshman Team and was named Big Ten Freshman of the Week four times. In her Sophomore year, Williams set a new Big Ten record for most consecutive double-double's. Williams was named the Big Ten Defensive Player of the Year as well as named in the 2024 All-B1G Defensive Team and made it into the 2024 Big Ten First Team and the 2024 Big Ten All-Academic Team.

On February 12, 2025, Williams announced that she would be entering the transfer portal.

On April 30, 2025, Williams announced that she will be playing for the UConn Huskies.

== Professional career ==
The Connecticut Sun drafted Williams with the 33rd overall pick in the 2026 WNBA draft on April 13, 2026. She was subsequently traded immediately after completing media interviews at the draft to the expansion Portland Fire in exchange for 37th overall pick Taylor Bigby and a third-round pick in the 2027 WNBA draft.

On November 13, 2026, Williams joined Polish team Wisła Kraków.

== National team career ==
On July 4, 2024, Williams was named to Team USA's 3x3 Women's Nations League squad to compete at the FIBA Nationals League Americas Conference from July 22–28 in Mexico City. Williams helped the team qualify for the 2024 FIBA 3x3 U23 World Cup.

== Career statistics ==
Legend
GP	Games played	GS	Games started	MPG	Minutes per game	RPG	Rebounds per game
APG	Assists per game	SPG	Steals per game	BPG	Blocks per game	PPG	Points per game
TO	Turnovers per game	FG%	Field-goal percentage	3P%	3-point field-goal percentage	FT%	Free-throw percentage
**Bold**	Career best	°	League leader

=== College ===
Year	Team	GP	GS	MPG	FG%	3P%	FT%	RPG	APG	SPG	BPG	TO	PPG
2022–23	Wisconsin	31	30	24.8	54.3	0.0	66.9	5.4	0.7	0.7	1.9	2.9	12.7
2023–24	Wisconsin	30	29	30.0	51.9	**33.3**	**79.5**	**10.7**	0.9	0.8	**2.8**	3.6	17.4
2024–25	Wisconsin	30	30	**32.0**	49.3	8.3	78.0	9.8	**2.4**	**1.1**	2.3	3.3	**19.2**
2025–26	UConn	**38**	**38**	17.4	**58.8**	--	69.0	4.4	1.5	0.7	1.3	**1.6**	6.7
**Career**		129	127	25.5	52.5	23.1	74.9	7.4	1.4	0.8	2.0	2.8	13.6
Statistics retrieved from Sports-Reference.
