= Karlie Samuelson =

American basketball player (born 1995)

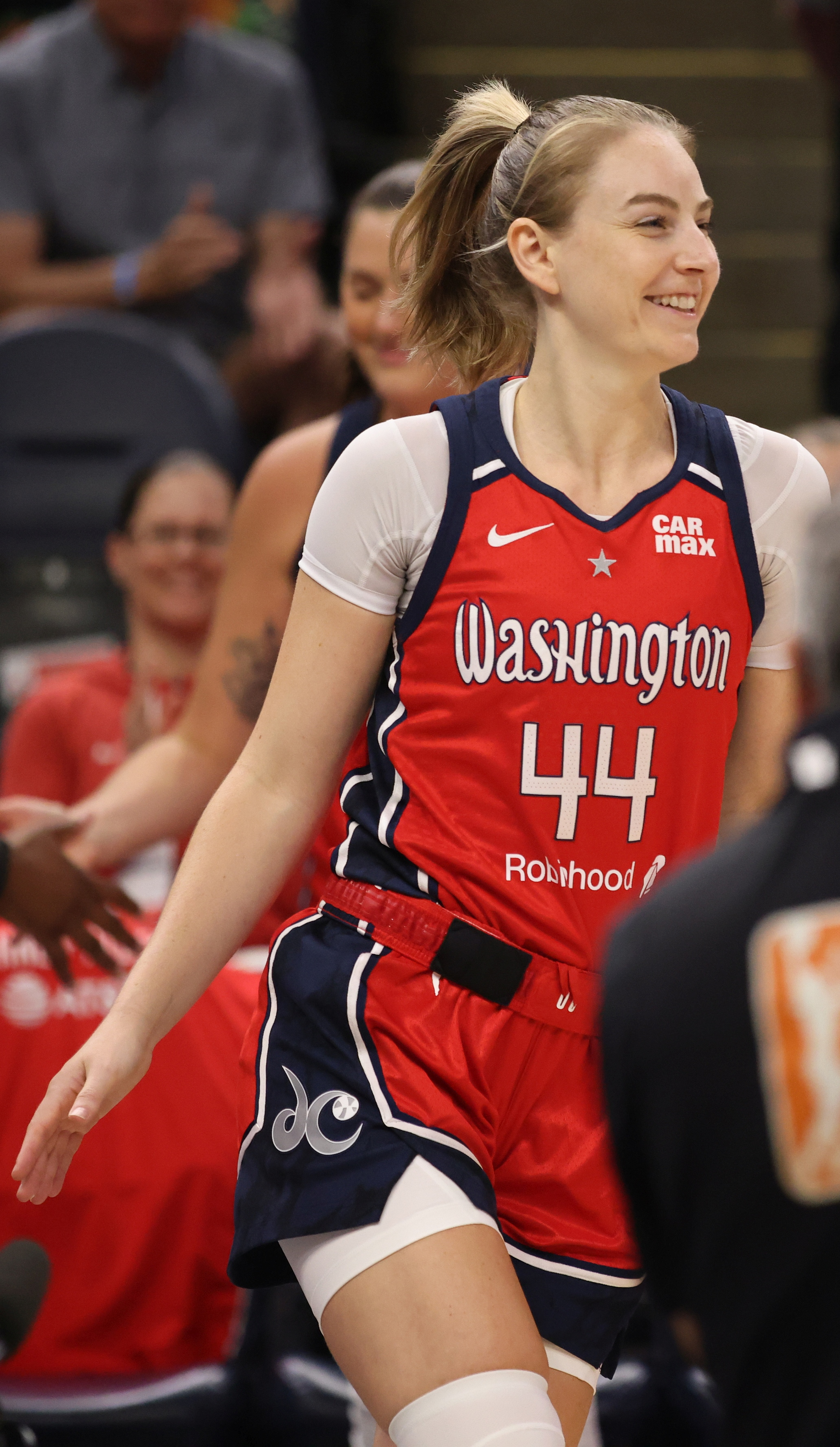
- Samuelson with the Washington Mystics in 2024

No. 44 – Portland Fire
- Position: Shooting guard
- League: WNBA

Personal information
- Born: May 10, 1995 (age 31) Fullerton, California, U.S.
- Listed height: 6 ft 0 in (1.83 m)
- Listed weight: 159 lb (72 kg)

Career information
- High school: Mater Dei (Santa Ana, California)
- College: Stanford (2013–2017)
- WNBA draft: 2017: undrafted
- Playing career: 2017–present

Career history
- 2017–2018: Pallacanestro Vigarano
- 2018: Los Angeles Sparks
- 2018–2019: BC Castors Braine
- 2019: Los Angeles Sparks
- 2019: Dallas Wings
- 2019–2022: CB Avenida
- 2021: Los Angeles Sparks
- 2021: Seattle Storm
- 2022: Phoenix Mercury
- 2022–23: Townsville Fire
- 2023: Los Angeles Sparks
- 2023–2024: London Lions
- 2024: Washington Mystics
- 2024–2025: Çukurova Basketbol
- 2025: Minnesota Lynx
- 2026–present: Portland Fire
- 2026–present: ÇBK Mersin

Career highlights
- EuroCup champion (2024); EuroCup Finals MVP (2024); 2× Spanish National League champion (2021, 2022); 2× Queen's Cup winner (2020, 2022); Belgian National League champion (2019); Women's National Basketball League champion (2023); WBBL Trophy champion (2024); Turkish Cup winner (2025); All Pac-12 (2017)
- Stats at Basketball Reference

Karlie Anne Samuelson (born May 10, 1995) is a British-American professional basketball player for the Portland Fire of the WNBA and for ÇBK Mersin of the Turkish Super League who has represented the Great Britain national team. In college, Samuelson played for Stanford University. Her sisters are Bonnie and Katie Lou Samuelson.

== Early life and college ==
An Orange County native, Samuelson is the second of three daughters of two former athletes, her father having played basketball in both Cal State Fullerton and England, where he met her mother, a former netball player who reached the England national team. During her high school years, Samuelson played at Huntington Beach's Edison and Mater Dei High School, in Santa Ana before heading off to play in college at Stanford University alongside older sister Bonnie. Samuelson played from 2013 to 2017, while also graduating in human biology. Samuelson, who excelled as a three-point shooter, qualified twice for the NCAA final Four, in her freshman year of 2013, and later as a senior in 2017, where she had been a Regional All-Tournament Team before losing the semifinal with a sprained ankle.

== Professional career ==
=== WNBA career ===
After being undrafted in the 2017 WNBA draft, Samuelson joined the Los Angeles Sparks for the 2017 season and played 3 pre-season games, but a fractured left foot suffered during training camp led the team to waive her. Afterwards, she became an assistant coach for the Vanguard Lions, while pursuing a master's degree in Coaching and Athletic Administration from Concordia University Irvine, and also re-signed with the Los Angeles Sparks for the 2018 WNBA season where she made the final roster. Samuelson made her WNBA debut on the 20th of May against the Minnesota Lynx scoring 3 points in 13 minutes of playing time, and ultimately appeared in 20 games of the 2018 season and 2 playoff games, averaging 4.2 minutes per game. While Samuelson left having played four games after to the return of starter Jantel Lavender, the Sparks eventually brought her back for the rest of the season in June. After being waived during the Sparks training camp, Samuelson joined them late in the 2019 WNBA season, following her appearance for Great Britain in EuroBasket Women 2019.

In August 2019, she played four games for the Dallas Wings, who renewed her contract in 2020 and also signed her younger sister Katie Lou Samuelson, but both were waived before the season begun. At the same time the Samuelson sisters were playing together in Spain for Perfumerías Avenida.

Karlie signed again with the Sparks again in 2021, where she made her first start in the league, but she was ultimately released in August, and again joined her sister on the Seattle Storm.

In May 2022, the Phoenix Mercury signed Samuelson to a hardship contract.

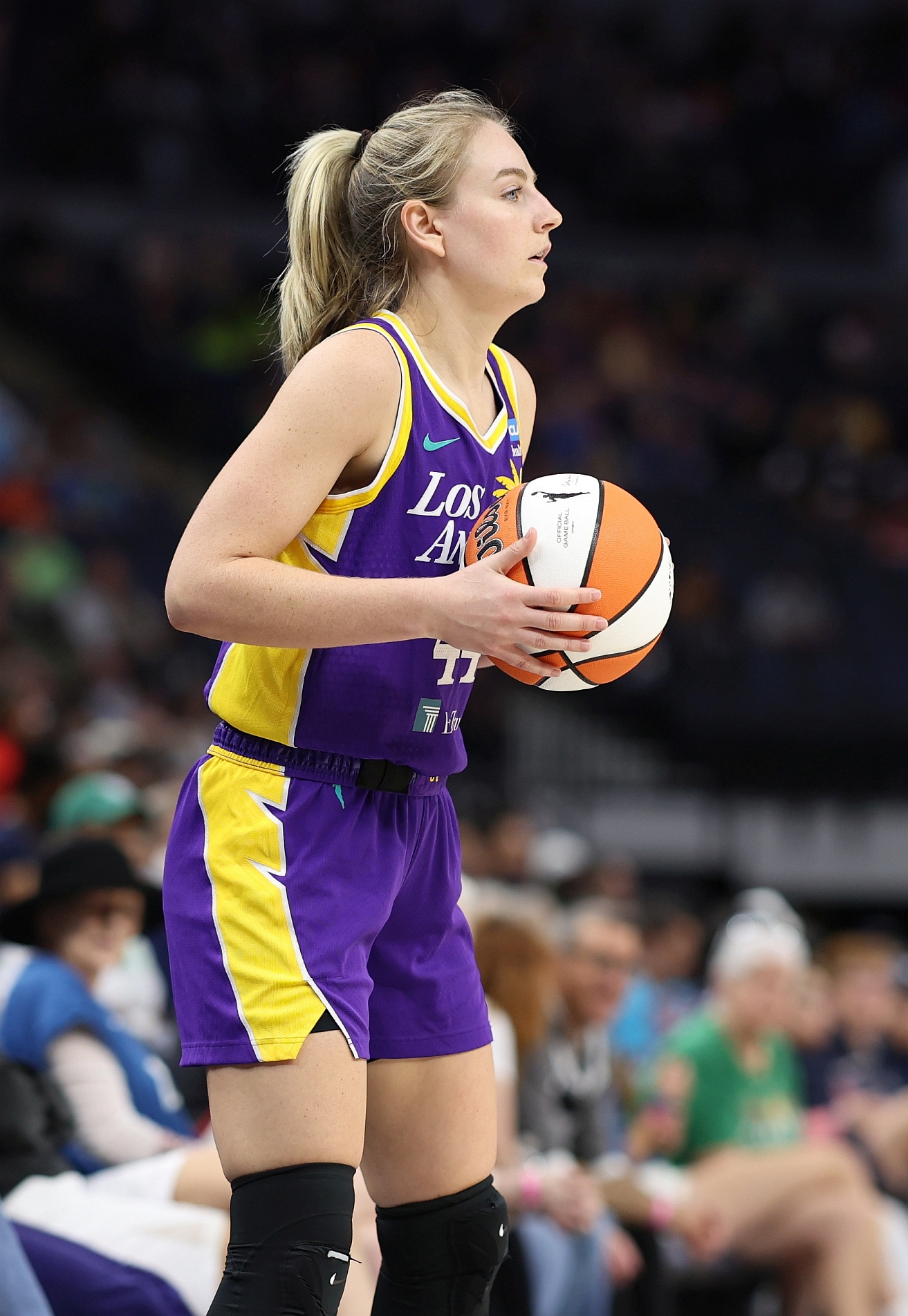
Samuelson with the Sparks in 2023.

Samuelson rejoined the Sparks for the 2023 WNBA season, having her most productive WNBA season yet, playing 34 games and ranking sixth among the league's 3-point shooters with an 42.6% average.

Prior to the 2024 WNBA season, Samuelson signed with the Washington Mystics. It was her overall 18th WNBA contract, and the first that encompassed a whole season. She played 29 regular season games, posting a career-high 8.4 points per game. Samuelson became ninth in the WNBA's all-time three-point percentage with 39.7%.

On April 14, 2025, the day of the 2025 WNBA draft, the Minnesota Lynx acquired Samuelson, sending the Mystics their first-round pick at the 2026 WNBA draft. She was brought in by Eric Thibault, her coach at the Mystics who had just become an assistant manager in Minnesota. Samuelson played in 16 games for the Lynx, averaging 14.3 minutes, 3.3 points and 1.1 assists, before sustaining a season-ending foot injury. On August 3, Samuelson was traded to the Dallas Wings along with Diamond Miller and a 2027 second-round draft pick, in exchange for DiJonai Carrington. She was subsequently waived by the Wings.

On April 11, WNBA expansion team Portland Fire signed Samuelson as a free agent.

=== Europe and Australia ===
Samuelson made her professional debut in Italy's Serie A1 with Pallacanestro Vigarano, but left the team in January 2018, having played 13 games for Vigarano, alleging personal reasons.

Following the Sparks' elimination in the 2018 WNBA playoffs, Samuelson signed to play for BC Castors Braine in Belgium. She averaged 16 points per game on the season in the national league, and 9.7 per game in the Euroleague.

After she and Katie were waived by the Dallas Wings in 2019, the sisters both signed to play for CB Avenida in Spain, with whom she won two Liga Femenina de Baloncesto championships. She left Spain in 2021 and signed with Australian team Townsville Fire in 2022.

Samuelson signed with the London Lions ahead of the 2023–24 season. She would be chosen as the 2023–24 EuroCup Women Player of the Month for February 2024 by leading the Lions in their quarterfinals victory over Melikgazi Kayseri scoring 44 points and shooting almost 63 percent in both games. The Lions would then win over Beşiktaş JK, in the final, where Samuelson was chosen as Finals MVP for averaging 17.5 points, 3.5 rebounds and an efficiency of 17.0 across both games of the decision.

She played for CBK Mersin of the Turkish Super League during the 2024–2025 season. Samuelson and Mersin reached the 2024–25 EuroLeague Women final, lost to ZVVZ USK Praha.

== International career ==
Like her sister Bonnie, Samuelson chose to play internationally for the Great Britain women's national basketball team, using her mother's nationality. She debuted for the team in February 2018, playing two games in the EuroBasket Women 2019 qualification. In November, Samuelson helped the British team win the final two games, granting them a spot in EuroBasket Women 2019. During the European tournament, Samuelson averaged 11.1 points, 4.4 assists and 2.9 rebounds as the British team finished in fourth place. She also played the Olympic Qualifying Tournament, missing the Olympic qualifying spot while averaging 10.3 points, 4.3 assists and 2 rebounds.

== Career statistics ==
Legend
| GP | Games played | GS | Games started | MPG | Minutes per game | RPG | Rebounds per game |
| APG | Assists per game | SPG | Steals per game | BPG | Blocks per game | PPG | Points per game |
| TO | Turnovers per game | FG% | Field-goal percentage | 3P% | 3-point field-goal percentage | FT% | Free-throw percentage |
| **Bold** | Career best | ° | League leader |

=== WNBA ===
==== Regular season ====
Stats current through end of 2025 season

WNBA regular season statistics
| Year | Team | GP | GS | MPG | FG% | 3P% | FT% | RPG | APG | SPG | BPG | TO | PPG |
|---|---|---|---|---|---|---|---|---|---|---|---|---|---|
| 2018 | Los Angeles | 20 | 0 | 4.2 | .389 | .313 | — | 0.5 | 0.3 | 0.1 | **0.3** | 0.2 | 1.0 |
| 2019 | Los Angeles | 3 | 0 | 12.0 | .143 | .167 | — | 0.7 | 1.0 | 0.0 | 0.0 | **0.0** | 1.0 |
| 2019 | Dallas | 4 | 0 | 12.0 | .286 | .333 | — | 0.5 | 0.5 | 0.8 | **0.3** | **0.0** | 1.5 |
| 2020 | Did not play (waived) | | | | | | | | | | | | |
| 2021 | Los Angeles | 11 | 3 | 15.8 | .382 | **.478** | .714 | 2.3 | 0.8 | 0.6 | 0.0 | 0.5 | 3.8 |
| 2021 | Seattle | 3 | 0 | 10.7 | .300 | .125 | **1.000** | 0.3 | 0.7 | 0.0 | 0.0 | 1.0 | 3.0 |
| 2022 | Phoenix | 1 | 0 | 10.0 | .333 | .333 | — | **3.0** | 1.0 | 0.0 | 0.0 | 1.0 | 3.0 |
| 2023 | Los Angeles | **34** | **23** | **26.1** | **.463** | .426 | .941 | **3.0** | 2.0 | 0.6 | 0.1 | 0.9 | 7.7 |
| 2024 | Washington | 29 | 19 | 24.5 | .409 | .398 | .923 | 2.6 | **2.1** | **0.9** | 0.0 | 0.9 | **8.4** |
| 2025 | Minnesota | 16 | 4 | 14.3 | .333 | .353 | .929 | 1.3 | 1.1 | 0.4 | 0.1 | 0.7 | 3.3 |
| **Career** | 7 years, 6 teams | 121 | 49 | 18.3 | .411 | .392 | .920 | 2.0 | 1.4 | 0.6 | 0.1 | 0.6 | 5.3 |

==== Playoffs ====
WNBA playoff statistics
| Year | Team | GP | GS | MPG | FG% | 3P% | FT% | RPG | APG | SPG | BPG | TO | PPG |
|---|---|---|---|---|---|---|---|---|---|---|---|---|---|
| 2018 | Los Angeles | 1 | 0 | 3.0 | — | — | — | 1.0 | 0.0 | 0.0 | 0.0 | 0.0 | 0.0 |
| **Career** | 1 year, 1 team | 1 | 0 | 3.0 | — | — | — | 1.0 | 0.0 | 0.0 | 0.0 | 0.0 | 0.0 |

=== College ===
NCAA statistics
| Year | Team | GP | GS | MPG | FG% | 3P% | FT% | RPG | APG | SPG | BPG | TO | PPG |
|---|---|---|---|---|---|---|---|---|---|---|---|---|---|
| 2013–14 | Stanford | 32 | 2 | 15.5 | .404 | .348 | .907 | 1.2 | 1.3 | 0.4 | 0.1 | **0.7** | 5.1 |
| 2014–15 | Stanford | 29 | 16 | 23.0 | .430 | .398 | .483 | 2.4 | 1.0 | 0.5 | 0.1 | 1.1 | 6.4 |
| 2015–16 | Stanford | 35 | **35** | 30.4 | .455 | .473 | **.909** | **3.4** | 2.2 | **1.1** | **0.2** | 1.1 | 9.8 |
| 2016–17 | Stanford | **38** | **35** | **33.5** | **.482** | **.485** | .864 | **3.4** | **2.7** | **1.1** | **0.2** | 1.4 | **12.4** |
| **Career** | | 134 | 88 | 26.1 | .454 | .443 | .833 | 2.7 | 1.9 | 0.8 | 0.2 | 1.1 | 8.7 |
