= Portland Fire =

Women's National Basketball Association team in Portland, Oregon

- 2026 Portland Fire season
- Conference: Western
- League: WNBA
- Founded: September 18, 2024; 2 years ago
- History: Portland Fire; 2026–present
- Arena: Moda Center
- Location: Portland, Oregon
- Team colors: Red, blue, pink
- President: Clare Hamill (interim)
- Vice-president: Ashley Battle
- General manager: Vanja Černivec
- Head coach: Alex Sarama
- Assistants: Brittni Donaldson; Sylvia Fowles; Danielle Boiago; Sefu Bernard
- Ownership: Lisa Bhathal Merage and Alex Bhathal (via RAJ Sports)
- Website: fire.wnba.com

The Portland Fire are an American professional basketball team based in Portland, Oregon. The Fire compete in the Women's National Basketball Association (WNBA) as a member of the Western Conference. The team plays its home games at Moda Center. Beginning play in May 2026, the franchise is the second WNBA team in the city's history, following the original Portland Fire in the early 2000s.

On August 23, 2026, Portland Fire unveiled Rose, a pink, glittery-breathing dragon mascot.

== History ==
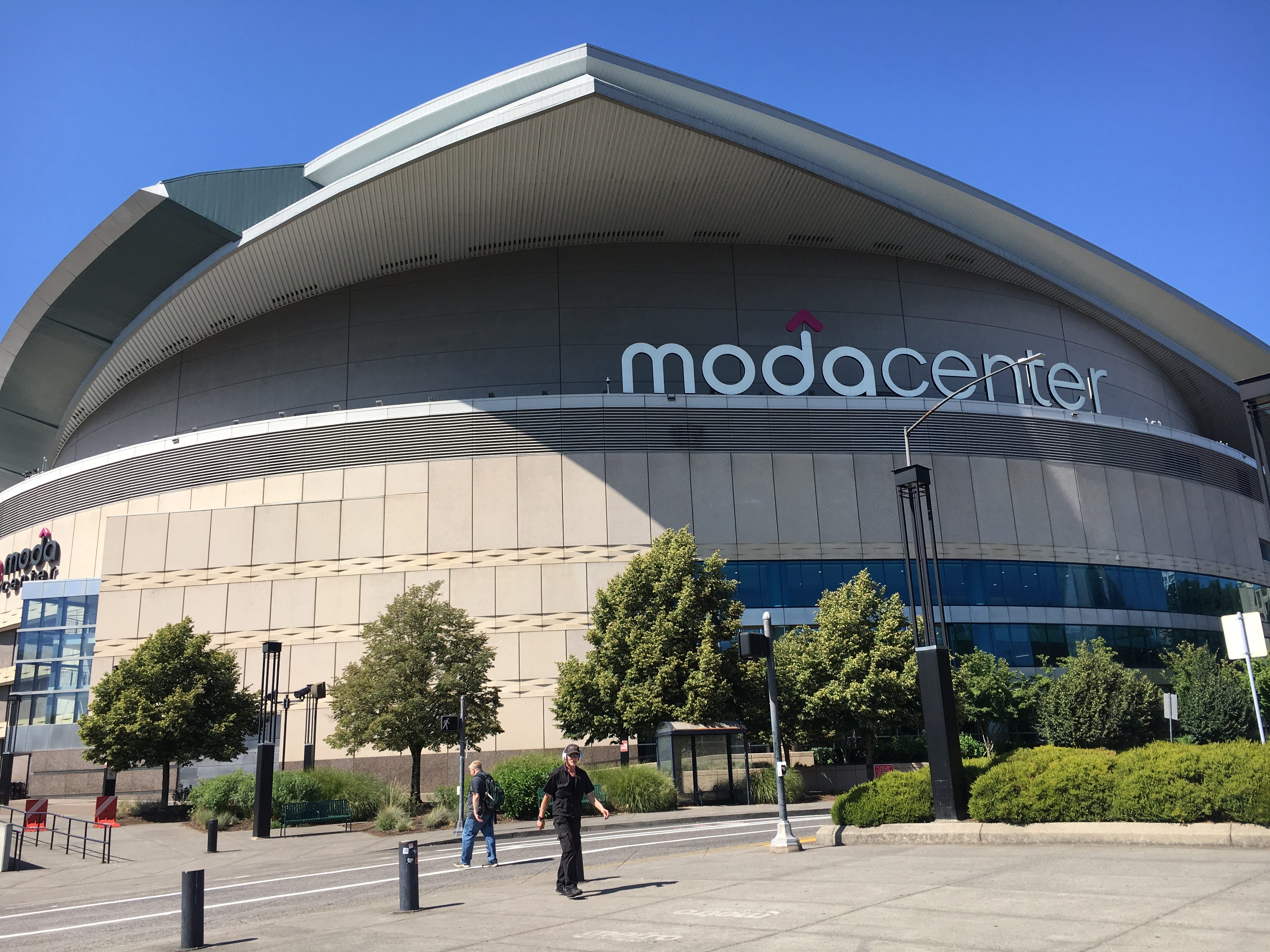
The Portland Fire play at the Moda Center (exterior pictured in 2019)

The city's first WNBA team, the Portland Fire, played from 2000 until they folded in 2002; they were named in reference to the use of fire and smoke signals by the native peoples of the area, the Multnomah and Clackamas. In February 2023, WNBA commissioner Cathy Engelbert visited Portland for an event at The Sports Bra co-hosted by US senator Ron Wyden, along with personnel from the Portland Trail Blazers, Portland Thorns FC, and Oregon and Oregon State's women's basketball teams. In October 2023, the WNBA was set to award a team to Portland with tech billionaire Kirk Brown as the planned owner of the team. Plans fell through days before a planned October 26 announcement when Brown pulled out which left the potential team without the required $50 million expansion fee. Brown and the league had a difference of opinion on the team's name branding, with Brown wanting the team to be called the Rose City Royalty, but Engelbert was "uncomfortable" with that idea. The league also found Brown's ownership stake in Shoot 360, a basketball training center with locations across the country, as a potential conflict of interest. The WNBA wanted him to give up his investment, but he refused and withdrew his bid with all of the conditions required.

On September 18, 2024, Portland was officially awarded a franchise, which will be the WNBA's 15th team. The team will be owned by Lisa Bhathal Merage and her brother Alex Bhathal via RAJ Sports, who also own the Thorns. They paid the WNBA $125 million for the franchise. Lisa Bhathal Merage will serve as controlling owner and WNBA Governor; Alex Bhathal will serve as Alternate Governor. The team will begin play in 2026. The Bhathals began conversations with the WNBA in late 2023 after the previous attempt to bring a team to Portland fell apart. On the decision to award Portland a team, Engelbert said "I think Portland has proven they'll show up for women's sports and definitely for women's basketball, so we're excited to be coming back to the market". Alex added that he and his sister became convinced that Portland was a great market for women's sports during their process of purchasing the Thorns.

In February 2025, RAJ Sports announced the first of its kind joint practice facility between the Fire and the Thorns in Hillsboro. The initial phase will cost US$75 million with the overall cost being US$150 million for the multi-phase project. A 63,000-square-foot training facility designed specifically for women athletes will be constructed and sections for each teams' sports are expected to be completed in time for both teams' 2026 seasons. A groundbreaking ceremony was held in April. Also in April, Inky Son was hired as the team president, but she was fired in June. On June 27, former Nike executive Clare Hamill was named interim president. Earlier that month, the WNBA filed trademarks for the "Portland Fire" leading to speculation that the team would revive the name. On June 26, the team surpassed 10,000 season ticket deposits.

On July 15, 2025, the team announced that it would be named the Portland Fire, reviving the name of the original WNBA team.

Vanja Černivec was announced as the General Manager on August 25. Černivec served as the Golden State Valkyries' Vice President of Basketball Operations since July 2024. She played a pivotal role in building the franchise from the ground up – overseeing day-to-day basketball operations in its inaugural season, assisting with the hiring of coaching and operational staff, and leading the scouting department through the 2024 expansion draft and 2025 WNBA draft.

On October 14, Ashley Battle was named as Vice President of Basketball Operations, Strategy and Innovation.

On October 17 the team hired Alex Sarama, an assistant with the Cleveland Cavaliers, as its inaugural head coach. On November 24, the team hired Brittni Donaldson as assistant coach and assistant general manager. On December 22, Sylvia Fowles was hired as assistant coach.

On August 23, 2026, Portland Fire unveiled Rose, a pink, glittery-breathing dragon mascot.

=== Media ===
Gray Media carries the team's local games through its two stations in the area, with KPDX (channel 49) serving as the main broadcaster, with KPTV (channel 12) carrying select high-profile games, under the umbrella of the Rose City SportsNet, with Gray's Raycom Sports producing the telecasts. National games air among the league's multiple broadcast and cable partners, including Ion station KPXG-TV (channel 22).

== Coaches and staff ==
=== Head coach ===
- Alex Sarama

Portland Fire head coaches
Name	Start	End	Seasons	Regular season				Playoffs			
Name	Start	End	Seasons	W	L	PCT	G	W	L	PCT	G
Alex Sarama	October 17, 2025	Present	1	5	3	.625	0	0	0	–	0

=== Assistant coaches ===
- Brittni Donaldson
- Sylvia Fowles
- Danielle Boiago
- Sefu Bernard

=== Front office ===
- Ashley Battle – Vice president of basketball operations, strategy, and innovation
- Vanja Černivec – General manager
- Brittni Donaldson – Assistant general manager

== Season-by-season record ==
Portland Fire
Season	Team	Conference		Regular Season			Playoff Results
Season	Team	Conference		W	L	PCT	Playoff Results
2026	2026	West	5th	17	27	.386	Did not qualify
Regular season				17	27	.386	0 Conference Champions
Playoffs				0	0	–	0 WNBA Championships

== Players ==
=== Current roster ===
Portland Fire roster
Players
Coaches

Pos.	No.	Nat.	Name	Height	Weight	DOB	From	Yrs
G	3	(United States)	Barker, Sarah Ashlee (injured)	6' 0" (1.83m)	173 lb (78kg)	2001-09-10	Alabama	1
F	20	(Germany)	Bühner, Frieda	6' 1" (1.85m)	175 lb (79kg)	2004-05-28	Germany	R
G/F	6	(Canada)	Carleton, Bridget	6' 2" (1.88m)	190 lb (86kg)	1997-05-22	Iowa State	7
F/C	17	(Spain)	DiLeo, Megan	6' 4" (1.93m)	208 lb (94kg)	1996-12-13	Iowa	7
F	21	(United States)	Engstler, Emily	6' 1" (1.85m)	184 lb (83kg)	2000-05-01	Louisville	4
F	1	(United States)	Feagin, Sania (injured)	6' 3" (1.91m)		2003-03-15	South Carolina	1
C	15	(Germany)	Geiselsöder, Luisa	6' 4" (1.93m)	204 lb (93kg)	2000-02-10	Germany	1
G	2	(United States)	Harrison, Jordan	5' 6" (1.68m)		2004-04-26	West Virginia	R
G	0	(France)	Leite, Carla	5' 9" (1.75m)	151 lb (68kg)	2004-04-16	Tony Parker Academy (FRA)	1
G	7	(Slovenia)	Oblak, Teja	5' 8" (1.73m)		1990-12-20	Slovenia	R
F	24	(United States)	Osborne, Charisma	5' 9" (1.75m)	166 lb (75kg)	2001-07-03	UCLA	1
F	13	(Australia)	Puoch, Nyadiew	6' 3" (1.91m)	167 lb (76kg)	2004-06-23	Australia	R
G	44	(United Kingdom)	Samuelson, Karlie	6' 0" (1.83m)	160 lb (73kg)	1995-05-10	Stanford	7
C	25	(United States)	Williams, Serah	6' 4" (1.93m)		2004-01-17	Connecticut	R
G	77	(United Kingdom)	Winterburn, Holly	5' 11" (1.8m)		2000-10-01	East London (GBR)	R
G	—	(United States)	Ayrault, Julia (S)	6' 2" (1.88m)			Michigan State	–
G	—	(Spain)	Martín, Iyana (DP)	5' 9" (1.75m)		2006-01-18	Spain	–
G	10	(Croatia)	Mühl, Nika (injured)	6' 0" (1.83m)	156 lb (71kg)	2001-04-09	Connecticut	1

Head coach
(United Kingdom) Alex Sarama (Nottingham)
Assistant coaches
(United States) Sefu Bernard
(United States) Danielle Boiago
(United States) Brittni Donaldson (Northern Iowa)
(United States) Sylvia Fowles (LSU)

Legend

- (C) Team captain
- (DP) Unsigned draft pick
- (FA) Free agent
- (S) Suspended
- Injured

WNBA roster page

East
ATL
CHI
CON
IND
NY
TOR
WAS
West
DAL
GS
LV
LA
MIN
PHO
POR
SEA

== See also ==
- Rose (mascot)
- Women's sports in Portland, Oregon
