= Rachid Meziane =

French basketball coach (born 1980)

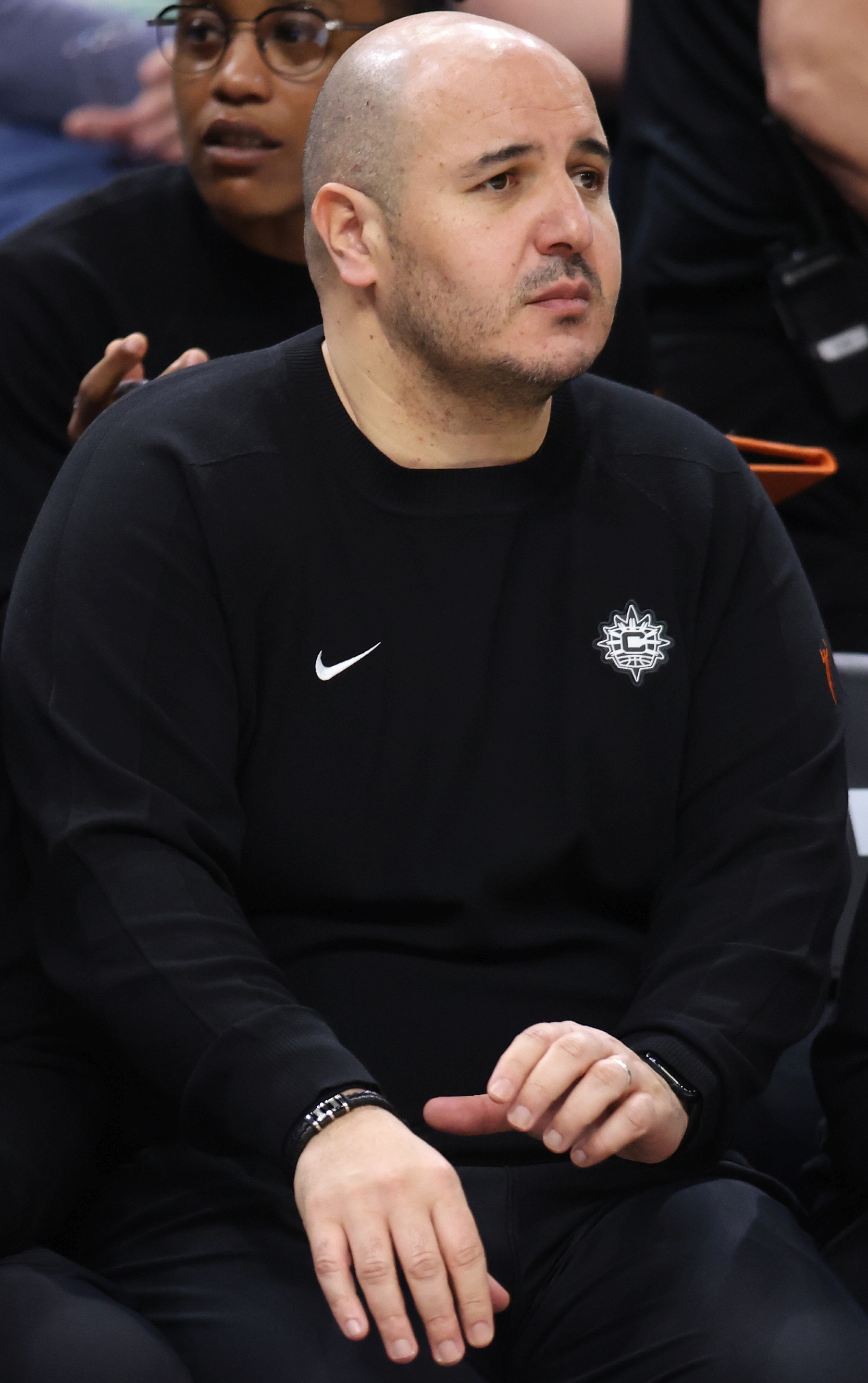
- Meziane with the Connecticut Sun in 2025

Houston Comets
- Position: Head coach
- League: WNBA

Personal information
- Born: 10 February 1980 (age 46) Clermont-Ferrand, France
- Coaching career: 2006–present

Career history

Coaching
- 2006–2012: Challes-les-Eaux (assistant)
- 2012–2017: Cavigal Nice
- 2017–2018: Montpellier
- 2019–2024: Villeneuve-d'Ascq
- 2025–2026: Connecticut Sun
- 2027–present: Houston Comets

Career highlights
- As head coach: Belgian Sports Coach of the Year (2023); Ligue Féminine champion (2024)
Medals
Women's basketball
Head coach for Belgium
EuroBasket Women
Gold medal – first place	2023 Israel / Slovenia

Rachid Meziane (born 10 February 1980) is a French professional basketball coach who is the head coach of the Houston Comets of the Women’s National Basketball Association.

== Coaching career ==
After being assistant to Aldo Corno at Challes for six years, Meziane became coach of Cavigal Nice in 2012, first in LF2 then in LFB. Despite relegation to Ligue 2 for the 2014–2015 season, he was kept on by Nice and obtained promotion to the elite for the 2015-2016 LFB season. Nice then surprised with five victories in a row to start the season, Rachid Meziane explaining: "Two years ago we had recruited 7 players. This off-season, I made the choice to make a smaller recruitment and to limit it to 5 players who have already performed in LFB to make up the starting five. With Gregory Muntzer [his assistant], we did a lot of scouting work to choose these players. Then, we were able to keep the players from last season that we wanted to keep and integrated youngsters from our training center. This has allowed us to have a fairly natural hierarchy of functions within the team (...) In the short term, we must stop the elevator effect, stabilize the first team in the LFB (...) In the medium term, we want to become a sure value in the division, and I think that a metropolis like Nice deserves the Eurocup." After qualifying for Europe, he was re-signed in the summer of 2016 for two additional seasons.

In the summer of 2017, he joined Montpellier, but was dismissed a few weeks into his second season due to conflicts with the management staff.

Meziane replaced Frédéric Dusart at Villeneuve-d'Ascq in the spring of 2019 and ensured the club's continued tenure in the LFB. After a good start to the 2022–2023 season, his contract was extended for three additional seasons in December 2022.

In the 2023–2024 season, Meziane led Villeneuve to their first French championship since 2017. The team also advanced to the EuroLeague finals—the first French team in 20 years to achieve that feat— where they lost to Fenerbahçe, 73–106. Meziane was named the EuroLeague Coach of the Year for the season. Following the season, he signed a four-year contract extension.

On 4 December 2024, Meziane was announced as the new head coach for the Connecticut Sun of the Women's National Basketball Association (WNBA). He would remain as the head coach of Villeneuve for the rest of the calendar year.

== National team coaching career ==
From 2014 to 2021, Meziane served as an assistant coach for the French women's team led by Valérie Garnier, with responsibilities including video analysis. He helped guide the French to silver medals at the 2015, 2017, 2019 and 2021 European Championships and a bronze medal at the 2020 Tokyo Olympics.

In January 2022, Meziane was appointed as an assistant coach to Valéry Demory, then head coach of the Belgian women's team. In November 2022, after Demory’s dismissal, he was promoted to head coach of the Belgian team. Meziane led the Belgian Cats to historic gold medals at the EuroBasket Women 2023. The team was named Belgian Sports Team of the Year, and Meziane was honored as Belgian Coach of the Year. Meziane also led Belgium to a fourth place finish at the 2024 Paris Olympics.

After Meziane accepted the Connecticut Sun job in December 2024, he said his continuation with Belgium was possible. However, on 27 January 2025, Mike Thibault was announced as Meziane's successor.

== Coaching record ==
Legend
Regular season	G	Games coached	W	Games won	L	Games lost	W–L %	Win–loss %
Playoffs	PG	Playoff games	PW	Playoff wins	PL	Playoff losses	PW–L %	Playoff win–loss %

Team	Year	G	W	L	W–L%	Finish	PG	PW	PL	PW–L%	Result
CON	2025	44	11	33	.250	6th in East	–	–	–	–	Missed Playoffs
CON	2026	44	11	33	.250	7th in East	–	–	–	–	Missed Playoffs
Career		88	22	66	.250		–	–	–	–	
