= Saniya Rivers =

American basketball player

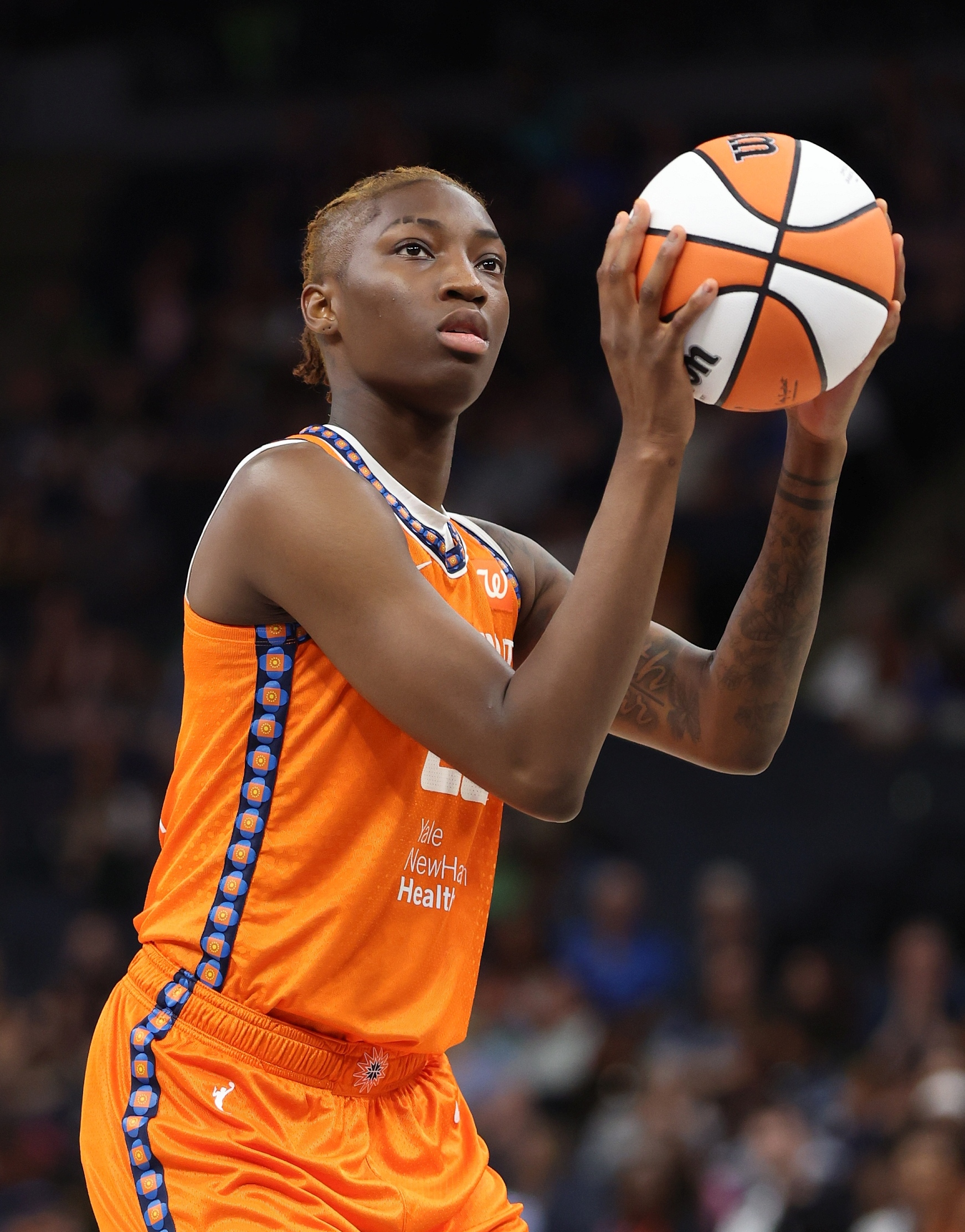
- Rivers with the Connecticut Sun in 2025

No. 22 – Houston Comets
- Position: Guard
- League: WNBA

Personal information
- Born: March 4, 2003 (age 23) Wilmington, North Carolina, U.S.
- Listed height: 6 ft 1 in (1.85 m)
- Listed weight: 159 lb (72 kg)

Career information
- High school: Eugene Ashley (Wilmington, North Carolina)
- College: South Carolina (2021–2022); NC State (2022–2025)
- WNBA draft: 2025: 1st round, 8th overall pick
- Drafted by: Connecticut Sun
- Playing career: 2025–present

Career history
- 2025–2026: Connecticut Sun
- 2026–present: Hive BC
- 2027–present: Houston Comets

Career highlights
- NCAA champion (2022); ACC Sixth Player of the Year (2023); 2× First-team All-ACC (2024, 2025); 2× ACC All-Defensive Team (2024, 2025); Gatorade National Player of the Year (2021); McDonald's All-American (2021); North Carolina Miss Basketball (2021)
- Stats at Basketball Reference

Saniya Rivers (/səˈnaɪʌ/ sə-NY-uh; born March 4, 2003) is an American professional basketball player for the Houston Comets of the Women's National Basketball Association (WNBA) and for Hive of Unrivaled. She played college basketball for NC State and South Carolina. Rivers was selected eighth overall by the Sun in the 2025 WNBA draft.

== High school career ==
Rivers played basketball for Eugene Ashley High School in Wilmington. She was a three-time North Carolina Gatorade player of the year and a four-time NCBCA All-state selection.

In her senior year, she averaged 34.3 points, 12.1 rebounds, 6.1 steals, and 5.8 assists per game and lead Ashley to a 2021 Mideastern Conference title. She was also the 2021 Gatorade National Player of the Year and a McDonald's All-American. Rivers was rated a five-star recruit, the number three player and the number 2 guard in the class of 2021 by ESPN. On May 30, 2020, she committed to South Carolina.

== College career ==
Rivers played as a reserve at South Carolina as the team won a national championship, appearing in 27 games and averaging 2.3 points and 1.4 assists. She scored a season-high eight points against Alabama shooting 4-7 and had a season-high five assists against Auburn. In May 2022, Rivers transferred to NC State.

In her sophomore season, Rivers played in 31 games, averaging 8.6 points and 5.2 rebounds. She led the team in rebounds, assists, steals, and blocks per game. She scored a season-high 22 points, a career high 5 assists, and a career-high 4 steals against Iowa. She later had 6 assists against Princeton in the first round of the NCAA tournament. Rivers was named as the ACC Sixth Player of the Year.

As a junior, Rivers was a First-team All-ACC and All-Defensive team selection. She was also an AP All-American Honorable Mention. She averaged 12.5 points, 6.1 rebounds, 3.7 assists, 2.1 steals, and 0.9 blocks, starting all 35 games. She led the team in assists and steals per game. In the postseason, Rivers was named to the Portland 4 Regional All-Tournament Team, as she helped the team to the Final Four.

== Professional career ==
=== WNBA ===
==== Connecticut Sun/Houston Comets (2025–present) ====
Rivers was selected eighth overall by the Connecticut Sun in the 2025 WNBA draft. She missed most of training camp, all of preseason, and the season opener to spend time with her family after her mother died. She made her debut on May 20, in a 62–87 loss to the Las Vegas Aces, scoring 11 points in 25 minutes off the bench.

=== Unrivaled ===
On November 5, 2025, it was announced that Rivers had been drafted by Hive BC for the 2026 Unrivaled season.

== Personal life ==
In April 2024, Rivers attended Kelsey Plum's second annual Dawg Class, a 3-day camp with the purpose of helping top women college athletes transition from collegiate to professional basketball. The 2024 camp was held at the IMG Academy and sponsored by Under Armour.

On April 30, 2025, her mother Demetria died of congestive heart failure.

== Career statistics ==
Legend
GP	Games played	GS	Games started	MPG	Minutes per game	RPG	Rebounds per game
APG	Assists per game	SPG	Steals per game	BPG	Blocks per game	PPG	Points per game
TO	Turnovers per game	FG%	Field-goal percentage	3P%	3-point field-goal percentage	FT%	Free-throw percentage
**Bold**	Career best	°	League leader

=== WNBA ===
==== Regular season ====
Stats current through end of 2026 season

WNBA regular season statistics
Year	Team	GP	GS	MPG	FG%	3P%	FT%	RPG	APG	SPG	BPG	TO	PPG
2025	Connecticut	42	25	26.1	.407	.341	.746	2.8	2.7	1.5	0.9	1.5	8.8
2026	Connecticut	38	18	22.5	.343	.171	.600	2.5	3.1	1.1	0.7	1.3	6.9
**Career**	2 years, 1 team	80	43	24.4	.378	.277	.664	2.7	2.9	1.3	0.8	1.4	7.9

=== College ===
*	Denotes season(s) in which Rivers won an NCAA Championship

Year	Team	GP	GS	MPG	FG%	3P%	FT%	RPG	APG	SPG	BPG	TO	PPG
2021–22*	South Carolina	27	0	13.0	24.5	3.2	50.0	1.6	1.4	0.5	0.5	**1.0**	2.3
2022–23	NC State	31	12	28.0	**43.9**	21.5	62.5	5.2	2.9	1.8	1.0	2.3	8.6
2023–24	NC State	**35**	**35**	**35.2**	38.2	26.0	**73.5**	6.1	3.7	**2.1**	0.9	2.6	**12.5**
2024–25	NC State	**35**	**35**	34.1	41.9	**27.2**	67.4	**6.6**	**3.8**	1.6	**1.3**	1.9	11.9
**Career**		128	82	28.5	39.5	22.9	67.9	5.1	3.1	1.6	1.0	2.0	9.2
Statistics retrieved from Sports-Reference.
