= Olivia Nelson-Ododa =

American basketball player (born 2000)

No. 9 – Houston Comets
- Position: Center
- League: WNBA

Personal information
- Born: August 17, 2000 (age 26) Lansing, Michigan, U.S.
- Listed height: 6 ft 5 in (1.96 m)
- Listed weight: 179 lb (81 kg)

Career information
- High school: Winder-Barrow (Winder, Georgia)
- College: UConn (2018–2022)
- WNBA draft: 2022: 2nd round, 19th overall pick
- Drafted by: Los Angeles Sparks

Career history
- 2022: Los Angeles Sparks
- 2022–2023: Melbourne Boomers
- 2023–2026: Connecticut Sun
- 2023–2024: Guangdong Vermilion Birds
- 2024–2025: Shanxi Flame
- 2026: Wuhan Shengfan
- 2026: Galatasaray
- 2027–present: Houston Comets

Career highlights
- First-team All-Big East (2022); Second-team All-Big East (2021); Big East Co-Defensive Player of the Year (2021); Second-team All-AAC (2020); McDonald's All-American (2018); Miss Georgia Basketball (2018)
- Stats at Basketball Reference
Medals
Women's basketball
Representing the United States
FIBA AmeriCup
Gold medal – first place	2019 Puerto Rico	Team
FIBA Americas Under-18 Championship
Gold medal – first place	2018 Mexico	Team
FIBA Under-17 World Cup
Bronze medal – third place	2016 Spain	Team
Women's 3x3 basketball
Representing the United States
Pan American Games
Gold medal – first place	2019 Peru	Team

Olivia Nelson-Ododa (born August 17, 2000) is an American professional basketball player for the Houston Comets of the Women's National Basketball Association (WNBA). She played college basketball at UConn.

== Early life ==
Nelson-Ododa played basketball for Winder-Barrow High School in Winder, Georgia. As a sophomore, she was named Athens Banner-Herald Co-Player of the Year after averaging 17 points and 10 rebounds per game, and leading her team to the Class 6A state final. She averaged 16.2 points, 9.5 rebounds, and 3.7 blocks per game as a junior before suffering a season-ending knee injury. As a senior, she averaged 19 points, 16 rebounds, and six blocks per game, and was named Miss Georgia Basketball. She was selected to play in the McDonald's All-American Game.

Nelson-Ododa was rated a five-star recruit and one of the top players in the 2018 class by ESPN. On November 15, 2017, she committed to playing college basketball for UConn over offers from Duke, South Carolina, Florida State, and Georgia.

== College career ==
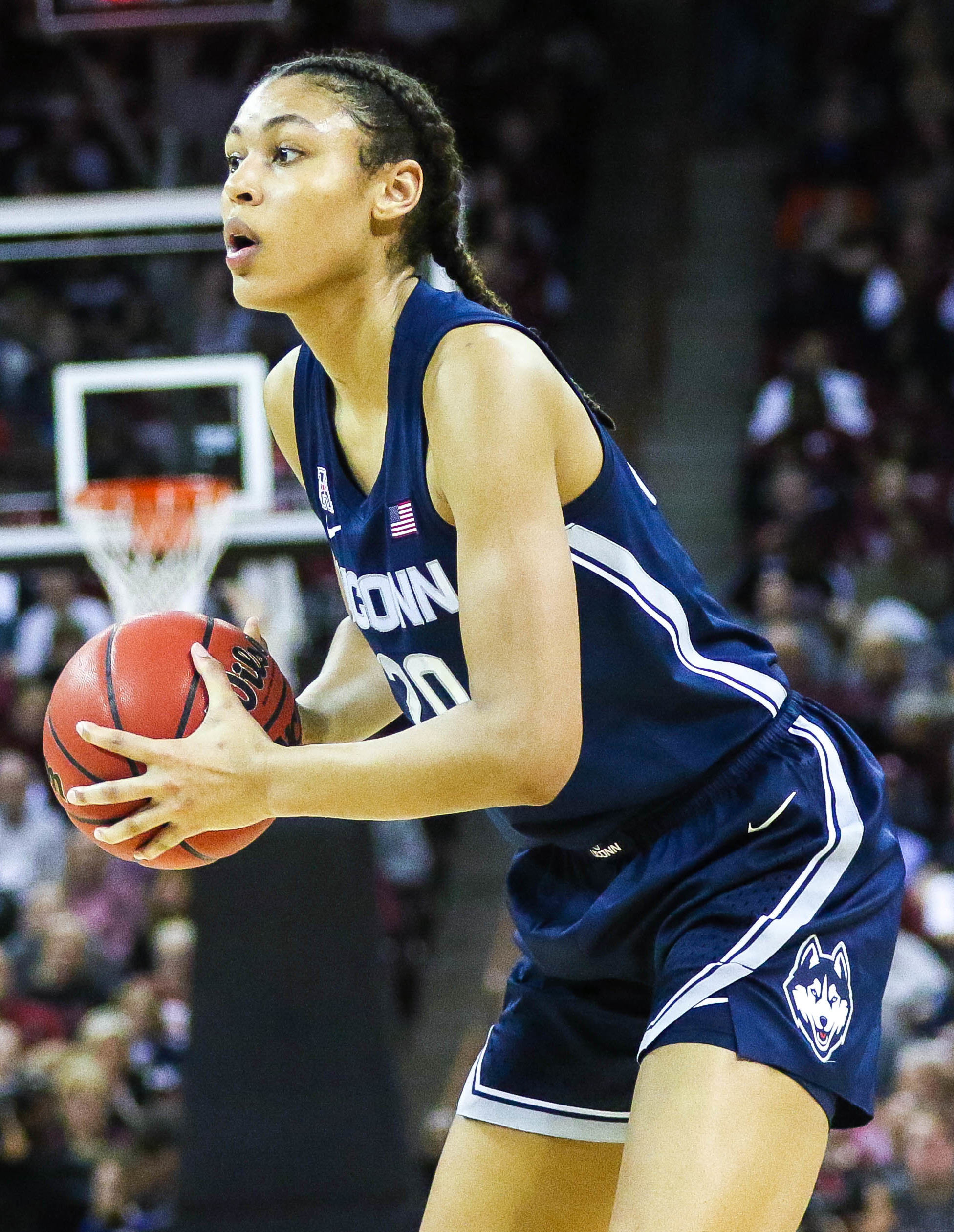
Nelson-Ododa with UConn in 2020

As a freshman at UConn, Nelson-Ododa mostly came off the bench, averaging 4.4 points, 3.8 rebounds and 1.4 blocks per game. On December 22, 2019, she recorded a career-high 27 points, 15 rebounds and seven blocks in a 97–53 win against Oklahoma. As a sophomore, Nelson-Ododa earned Second-Team All-American Athletic Conference (AAC) honors, and averaged 10.9 points, 8.5 rebounds and an AAC-best 3.1 blocks per game.

She became the fifth player in program history with over 100 blocks in a season. In her junior season, Nelson-Ododa averaged 12 points, 7.8 rebounds, 2.9 assists and 1.8 blocks per game. She was named Big East Co-Defensive Player of the Year and to the Second Team All-Big East.

== Professional career ==
=== WNBA ===
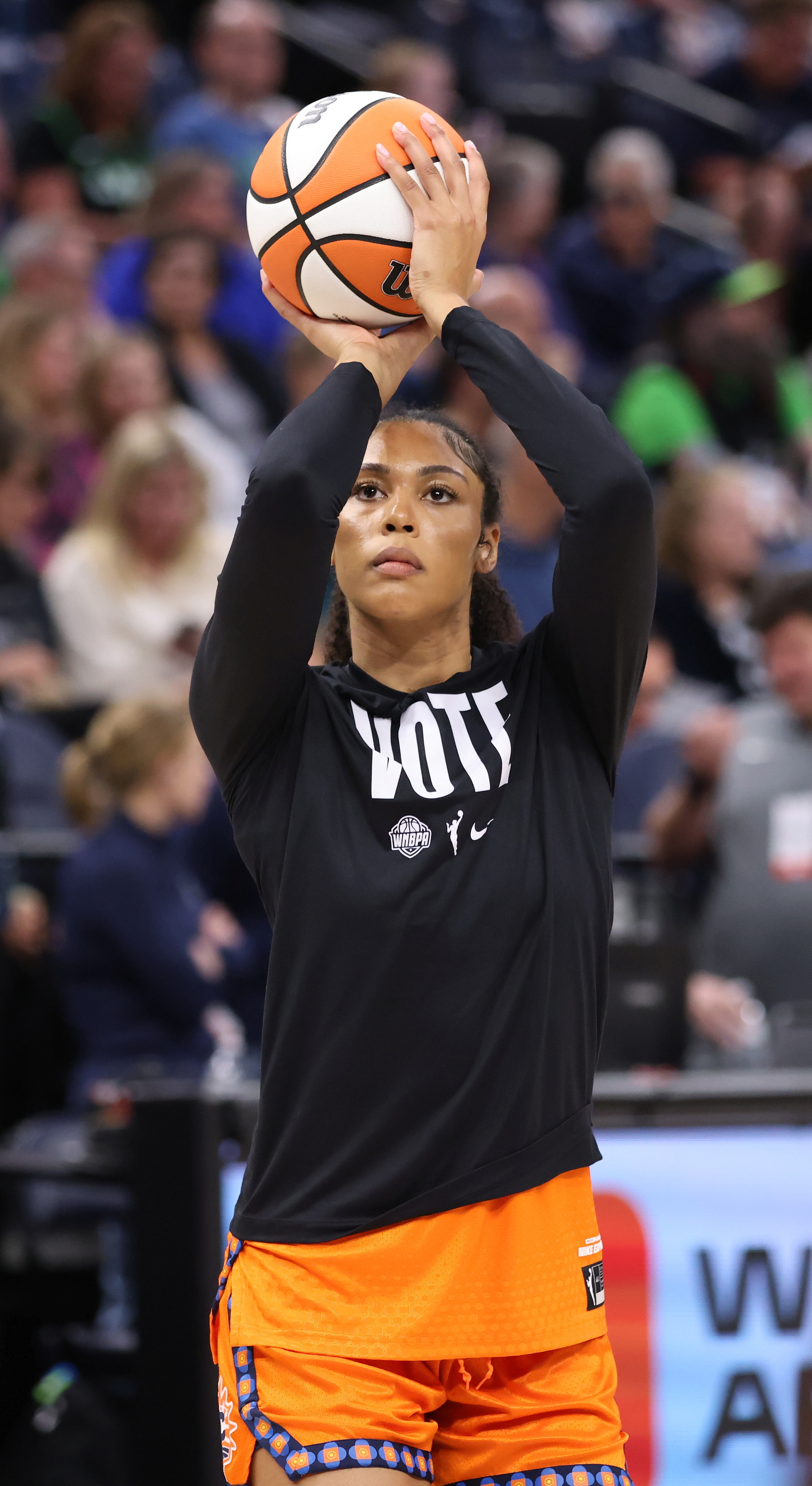
Nelson-Ododa with the Connecticut Sun in 2024

==== Los Angeles Sparks (2022) ====
On April 11, 2022, Nelson-Ododa was drafted in the second round, 19th overall, by the Los Angeles Sparks in the 2022 WNBA draft.

==== Connecticut Sun/Houston Comets (2023–present) ====
On January 13, 2023, Nelson-Ododa was traded to the Connecticut Sun.

=== Overseas ===
Nelson-Ododa played with the Melbourne Boomers in the 2022–23 WNBL season.

Nelson-Ododa played with the Guangdong Vermilion Birds of the Women's Chinese Basketball Association in the 2023–24 season.

Nelson-Ododa signed with the Shanxi Flame of the WCBA for the 2024–25 season.

Nelson-Ododa played with the Wuhan Shengfan of the WCBA in the 2025–26 season.

On September 19, 2026, she signed a contract with the Turkish giant Galatasaray.

== Career statistics ==
Legend
GP	Games played	GS	Games started	MPG	Minutes per game	RPG	Rebounds per game
APG	Assists per game	SPG	Steals per game	BPG	Blocks per game	PPG	Points per game
TO	Turnovers per game	FG%	Field-goal percentage	3P%	3-point field-goal percentage	FT%	Free-throw percentage
**Bold**	Career best	°	League leader

=== WNBA ===
==== Regular season ====
Stats current through end of 2026 season

WNBA regular season statistics
Year	Team	GP	GS	MPG	FG%	3P%	FT%	RPG	APG	SPG	BPG	TO	PPG
2022	Los Angeles	30	6	14.5	.566	.000	.703	2.9	0.4	0.3	0.8	1.0	4.0
2023	Connecticut	**39**	0	15.0	.537	.000	**.708**	3.7	0.6	0.5	0.8	**0.8**	4.5
2024	Connecticut	37	0	11.8	.495	.000	.659	2.5	0.2	0.4	0.6	**0.8**	3.4
2025	Connecticut	37	21	**21.6**	.526	**.500**	.703	5.0	0.9	0.7	**1.2**	1.1	8.2
2026	Connecticut	33	**23**	21.2	**.576**	.000	.683	**5.9**	**1.6**	**0.8**	0.8	1.6	**10.1**
**Career**	5 years, 2 teams	176	50	16.8	.542	.250	.692	4.0	0.7	0.5	0.8	1.0	6.0

==== Playoffs ====
WNBA playoff statistics
Year	Team	GP	GS	MPG	FG%	3P%	FT%	RPG	APG	SPG	BPG	TO	PPG
2023	Connecticut	**7**	**1**	**15.4**	**.667**	—	**1.000**	**3.4**	**0.6**	**1.0**	**0.9**	0.4	**4.3**
2024	Connecticut	**7**	0	9.7	**.667**	—	**1.000**	3.0	0.0	0.4	0.4	**0.1**	2.9
**Career**	2 years, 1 team	14	1	12.6	.667	—	1.000	3.2	0.3	0.7	0.6	0.3	4.3

=== College ===
NCAA statistics
Year	Team	GP	GS	MPG	FG%	3P%	FT%	RPG	APG	SPG	BPG	TO	PPG
2018–19	UConn	**38**	4	14.0	52.3	0.0	53.2	3.8	0.7	0.4	1.4	**0.9**	4.4
2019–20	UConn	32	**31**	26.3	55.2	0.0	54.5	**8.5**	2.8	1.1	**3.1**	2.4	10.9
2020–21	UConn	30	30	25.9	55.9	26.7	59.8	7.8	2.9	0.6	1.8	1.9	**12.0**
2021–22	UConn	33	**31**	**27.2**	**59.5**	**27.3**	**67.4**	7.5	**3.5**	**1.2**	1.7	2.2	9.2
**Career**		133	96	22.9	56.0	21.2	58.9	6.7	2.4	0.8	2.0	1.8	8.9

== National team career ==
Nelson-Ododa won a bronze medal with the United States at the 2016 FIBA Under-17 World Championship in Spain, where she averaged a team-high 12 points, 9.4 rebounds and 1.7 blocks per game.

At the 2018 FIBA Under-18 Americas Championship in Mexico, she averaged 9.2 points and 4.5 rebounds per game, helping her team win the gold medal. Nelson-Ododa was the youngest player representing the United States at the 2019 FIBA AmeriCup in Puerto Rico, where she won another gold medal.

Nelson-Ododa competed for the United States in 3x3 basketball at the 2019 Pan American Games in Peru, and won a gold medal.

== Personal life ==
Nelson-Ododa's father played basketball for Huntington University and the Kenyan national team. Her older brother, Alonzo, played professionally and was engaged to WNBA player Dearica Hamby. Her younger brother, Isaiah, plays college basketball for Tennessee Tech.
