= Leïla Lacan =

French basketball player

- Lacan in 2026

No. 71 – Fenerbahçe
- Position: Guard
- League: Turkish Super League; EuroLeague Women

Personal information
- Born: 2 June 2004 (age 22) Rodez, France
- Listed height: 5 ft 11 in (1.80 m)

Career information
- WNBA draft: 2024: 1st round, 10th overall pick
- Drafted by: Connecticut Sun
- Playing career: 2022–present

Career history
- 2022–2024: Angers
- 2024–2026: Basket Landes
- 2025–2026: Connecticut Sun
- 2026–present: Fenerbahçe
- 2027–present: Houston Comets

Career highlights
- French league champion (2025); FIBA Europe SuperCup Women champion (2026)
- Stats at Basketball Reference
Medals
Women's basketball
Representing France
Olympic Games
| Silver medal – second place | 2024 Paris | Team |
FIBA World Cup
| Silver medal – second place | 2026 Germany |
EuroBasket
| Bronze medal – third place | 2023 Israel/Slovenia |

Leïla Lacan (born 2 June 2004) is a French professional basketball player for the Houston Comets of the Women's National Basketball Association (WNBA) and for Fenerbahçe of the Turkish Super League. She was selected 10th overall by the Sun in the 2024 WNBA draft. Lacan plays for the France women's national basketball team and was part of the French team at the 2024 Summer Olympics, where she won a silver medal.

== Playing career ==
=== Europe ===
==== Angers (2022–2024) ====
Lacan began her professional career in 2022 for Union Féminine Angers Basket 49 in the Ligue Féminine de Basketball (LFB). During the 2023–24 season she averaged 12.7 points, 2.7 rebounds, 3.0 assists and 3.2 steals in 18 games.

==== Landes (2024–2026) ====
In June 2024, Lacan joined Basket Landes. She helped the team qualify to the 2024–25 EuroLeague Women. She helped the team win the league championship for the 2024–25 season and was named Finals MVP.

==== Fenerbahçe (2026–present) ====
On September 10, 2026, Lacan joined the Turkish powerhouse Fenerbahçe.

=== WNBA ===
==== Connecticut Sun/Houston Comets (2025–present) ====
On 15 April 2024, Lacan was drafted tenth overall by the Connecticut Sun in the 2024 WNBA draft. She didn't join the team for the 2024 WNBA season, remaining in France to compete with her national team in the 2024 Summer Olympics.

On 8 February 2025, Lacan signed her rookie-scale contract with the Sun. She was part of the opening day roster, but her contract was temporarily suspended due to overseas obligations, and she joined the team only on 2 July. She made her debut on 6 July, scoring 5 points in 24 minutes off the bench in a 68–86 loss to the Las Vegas Aces. She made her first start on 24 July, recording 2 points, 6 assists, and 3 steals in 19 minutes in an 86–101 loss to the Los Angeles Sparks. On 17 August, in a 93–99 overtime loss to the Indiana Fever, Lacan tied a WNBA record for most assists without a turnover, finishing with 14. The Sun saw a significant improvement with Lacan on the roster, earning 9 of their 11 wins after her arrival. Over the season, Lacan appeared in 25 games, starting 15, and averaged 10.4 points, 2.4 rebounds, 3.7 assists and 2.2 steals per game. She was named to the Associated Press All-Rookie Team.

On 28 May 2026, Lacan was set active by the Sun.

== National team career ==
Lacan made her international debut for France at the 2019 FIBA U16 Women's European Championship. During the tournament she averaged 9 points, 2.3 rebounds and 1.9 assists in seven games. She then represented France at the 2021 FIBA Under-19 Women's Basketball World Cup, where she averaged 6.4 points, 2.6 rebounds and 5.7 assists per game. At the 2022 FIBA U18 European Championship she recorded 14.4 points, 4.6 rebounds and 4 assists per game.

She again represented France at the 2023 FIBA Under-19 Women's Basketball World Cup where she averaged 17.1 points, 3.7 rebounds, 3.0 steals, and 2.9 assists per game. During the bronze medal game against Canada she recorded 11 points, four rebounds, four assists, three steals and one block, and lost 73–80 in overtime. Following the tournament she was named to the all-tournament team.

She made her senior national team debut for France at EuroBasket Women 2023 where she averaged 3.6 points, 0.6 rebounds and 1.6 assists in five games and won a bronze medal.

Lacan was named to the French national team for the 2024 Olympics. She averaged 4.2 points, 0.7 rebounds, 1.7 assists, and 1.0 steals in six games and won a silver medal.

Lacan helped lead the French team to a fourth-place finish at EuroBasket Women 2025, averaging 5.5 points, 2.8 rebounds, 2.7 assists, 1.0 steals and 0.5 blocks over six games.

== Career statistics ==
Legend
| GP | Games played | GS | Games started | MPG | Minutes per game | RPG | Rebounds per game |
| APG | Assists per game | SPG | Steals per game | BPG | Blocks per game | PPG | Points per game |
| TO | Turnovers per game | FG% | Field-goal percentage | 3P% | 3-point field-goal percentage | FT% | Free-throw percentage |
| **Bold** | Career best | ° | League leader |

=== WNBA ===
==== Regular season ====
Stats current through end of 2026 season

WNBA regular season statistics
| Year | Team | GP | GS | MPG | FG% | 3P% | FT% | RPG | APG | SPG | BPG | TO | PPG |
|---|---|---|---|---|---|---|---|---|---|---|---|---|---|
| 2025 | Connecticut | 25 | 15 | 26.6 | .477 | .224 | .857 | 2.4 | 3.7 | 2.2 | 0.2 | 1.9 | 10.4 |
| 2026 | Connecticut | 30 | 30 | 28.0 | .422 | .324 | .731 | 1.9 | 4.5 | 1.6 | 0.3 | 2.3 | 11.4 |
| **Career** | 2 years, 1 team | 55 | 45 | 27.4 | .445 | .284 | .780 | 2.1 | 4.1 | 1.9 | 0.3 | 2.1 | 10.9 |

== Orders ==
- Chevalier in the French Order of Merit: 2024

== Personal life ==
Born in France, Lacan is of Chadian descent.
