= Aaliyah Edwards =

Canadian basketball player (born 2002)

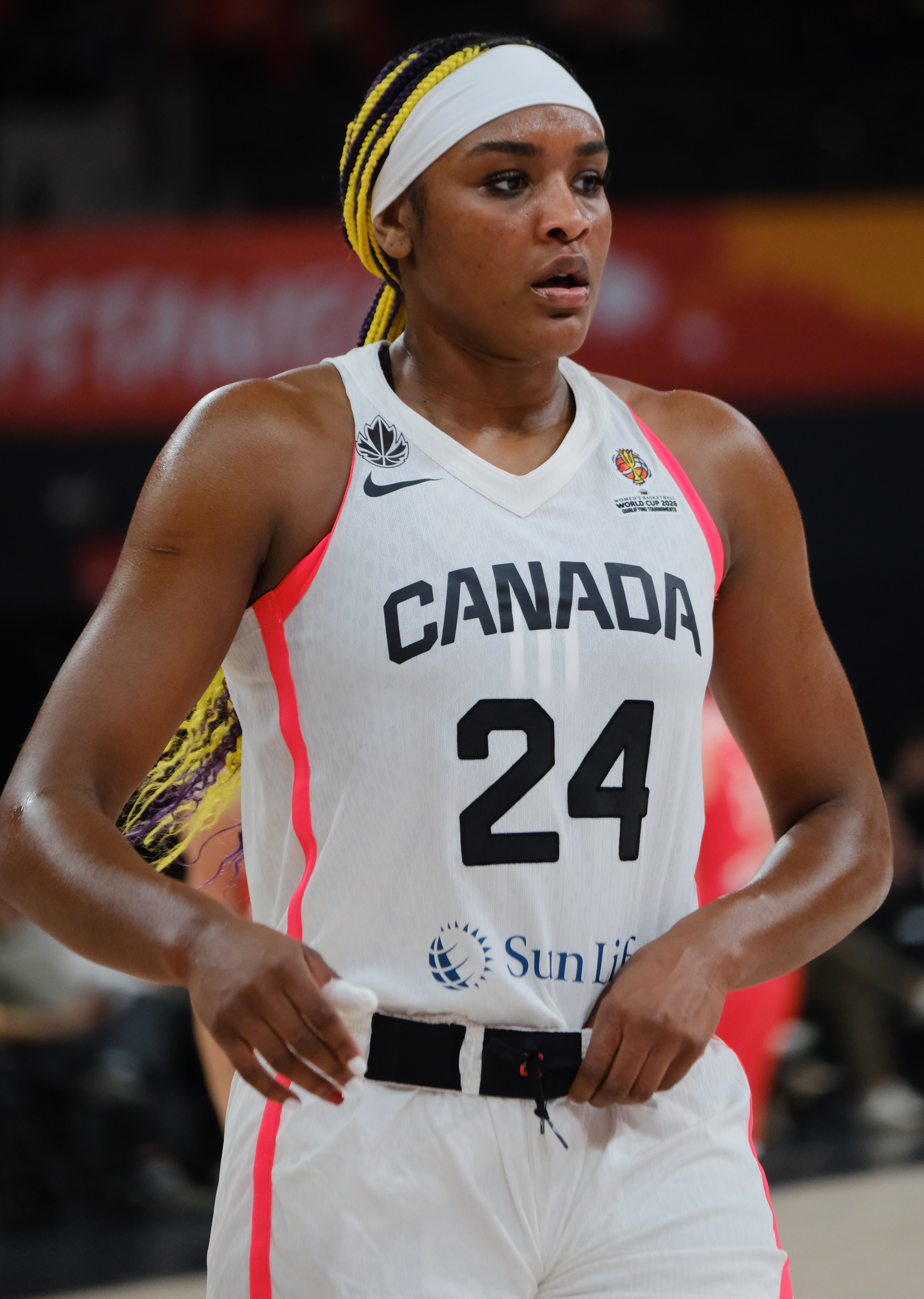
- Edwards with the Canada in 2026

No. 8 – Houston Comets
- Position: Small forward
- League: WNBA

Personal information
- Born: July 9, 2002 (age 24) Kingston, Ontario, Canada
- Listed height: 6 ft 3 in (1.91 m)
- Listed weight: 206 lb (93 kg)

Career information
- High school: Crestwood Prep (Toronto, Ontario)
- College: UConn (2020–2024)
- WNBA draft: 2024: 1st round, 6th overall pick
- Drafted by: Washington Mystics
- Playing career: 2024–present

Career history
- 2024–2025: Washington Mystics
- 2025: Mist BC
- 2025–2026: Connecticut Sun
- 2026–present: Lunar Owls BC
- 2027–present: Houston Comets

Career highlights
- Second-team All-American – USBWA (2024); Third-team All-American – AP, USBWA (2023); WBCA Coaches' All-American (2024); 2× First-team All-Big East (2023, 2024); Big East Most Improved Player of the Year (2023); Big East Sixth Woman of the Year (2021); Big East All-Freshman Team (2021); Big East tournament MOP (2023)
- Stats at Basketball Reference
Medals
Women's basketball
Representing Canada
FIBA Women's AmeriCup
Silver medal – second place	2019 Puerto Rico
Bronze medal – third place	2023 León
FIBA Americas Under-16 Championship
Silver medal – second place	2017 Argentina

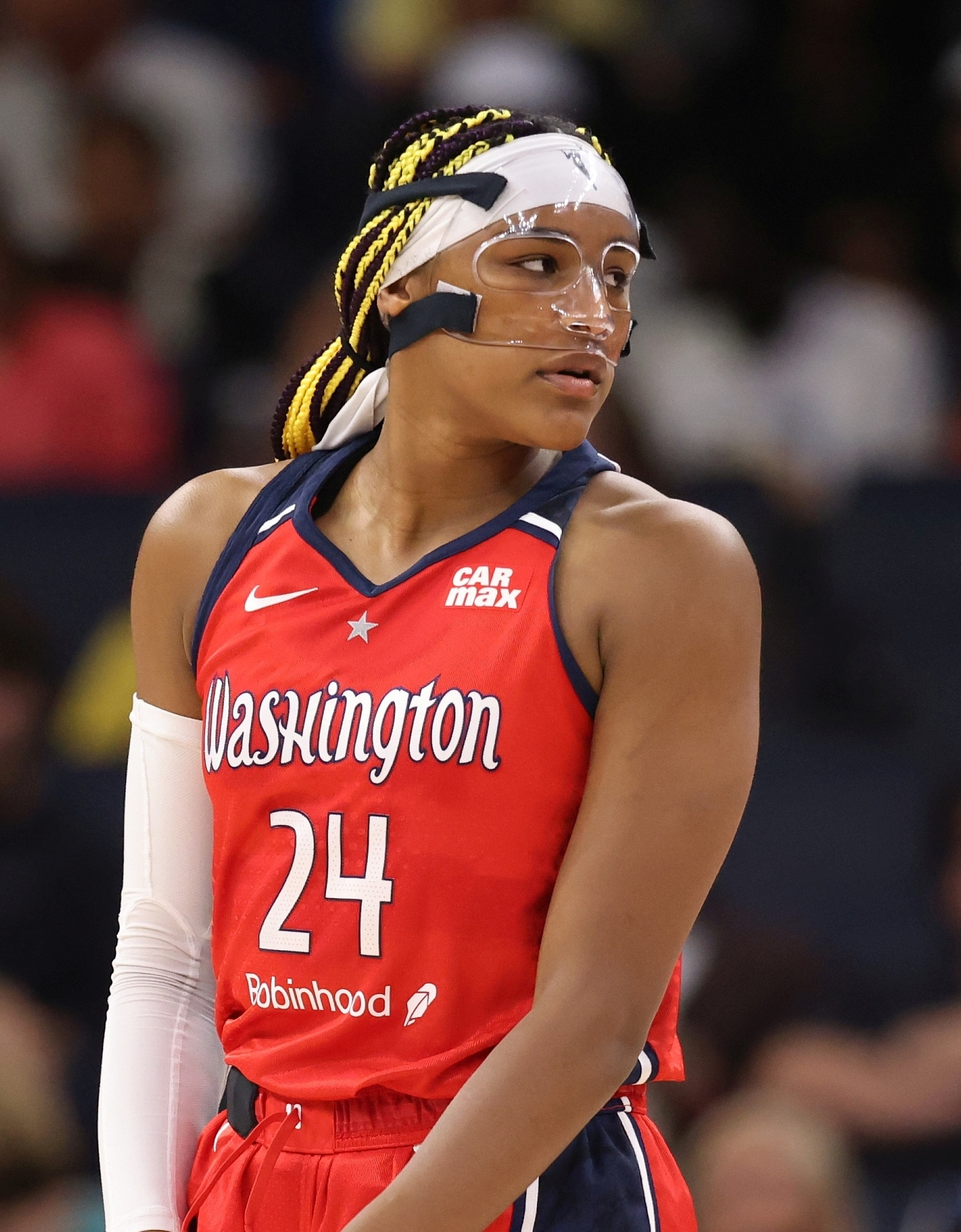
Edwards with the Washington Mystics in 2024

Aaliyah Mckenzie Edwards (born July 9, 2002) is a Canadian professional basketball player for the Houston Comets of the Women's National Basketball Association (WNBA) and for the Phantom of Unrivaled. She played college basketball at UConn before being selected sixth overall by the Mystics in the 2024 WNBA draft. Edwards has also played for the Canadian national team since 2018.

== Early life ==
Edwards was born in Kingston, Ontario, Canada, on July 9, 2002. She attended Crestwood Preparatory College in Toronto, where she led her school to three championships.

== College career ==
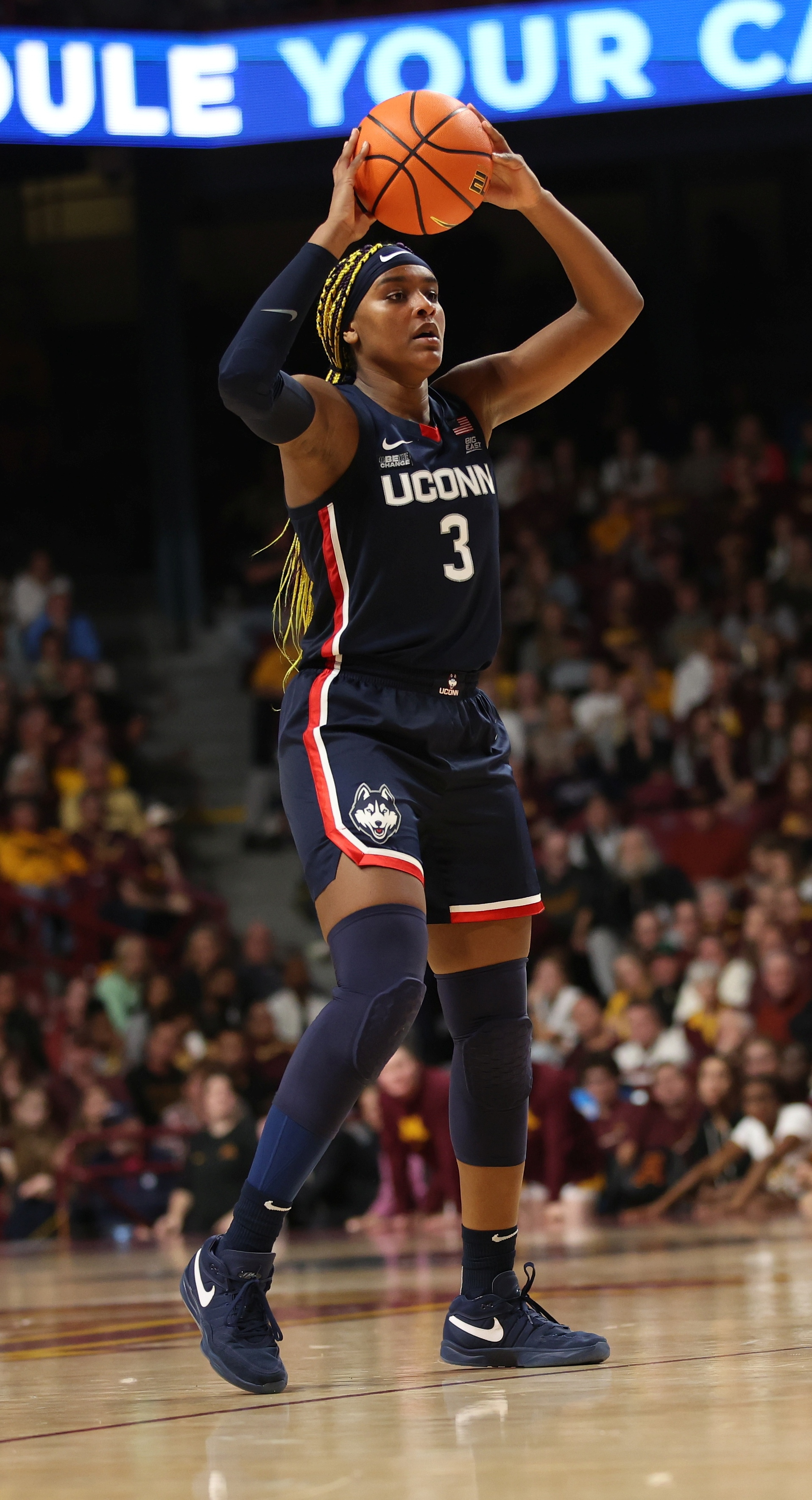
Edwards with the UConn Huskies in 2023

Edwards played college basketball for the UConn Huskies from 2020 to 2024. As a junior, she averaged a double-double of 18.3 points and 11 rebounds per game, an improvement from her sophomore season, when she averaged 7.9 points and 5.1 rebounds. She became the first UConn player with 20 points and 20 rebounds in a game since Maya Moore in 2010. As a senior, Edwards was selected first-team All-Big East and second-team All-America after UConn made the final four of the 2024 NCAA Division I women's basketball tournament.

== Professional career ==
=== WNBA ===
==== Washington Mystics (2024–2025) ====
On April 15, 2024, Edwards was selected in the first round of the 2024 WNBA draft as the sixth pick by the Washington Mystics. On April 18, she signed her rookie scale contract with the team. On May 15, Edwards made her debut in an 80–85 loss to the New York Liberty, recording 6 points and 2 rebounds in 14 minutes off the bench. She made her first career start on May 19 in a 75–84 loss to the Seattle Storm, posting 9 points and 11 rebounds. Edwards had her best game of the season on June 6 in a 71–79 loss to the Chicago Sky, with career highs in points (23), rebounds (14), and blocks (4). Throughout the season, she alternated between starting and playing off the bench, usually replacing the starting center, Shakira Austin, who struggled with injuries. Edwards herself missed three games in June and the final three games of the season in September due to back and ankle injuries, respectively. Overall, in her rookie season, she played in 34 games and started 17, averaging 7.6 points and 5.6 rebounds in 21.8 minutes per game.

Edwards missed the start of the 2025 season due to a back injury and lost her spot in the rotation to rookie Kiki Iriafen. Edwards struggled to carve out minutes throughout the season, and on July 1, it was reported that the Mystics were working to trade her. Overall, she played in 21 games for Washington in 2025, averaging 6.0 points and 3.3 rebounds in 13.3 minutes per game.

==== Connecticut Sun/Houston Comets (2025–present) ====
On August 7, 2025, Edwards was traded to the Connecticut Sun in exchange for Jacy Sheldon and the right to swap 2026 first-round picks (Washington's Minnesota pick for Connecticut's New York pick). She made her debut on August 11 in an 86–94 loss to the Las Vegas Aces, recording 4 points, 4 rebounds, 2 assists, and 1 steal in 17 minutes off the bench.

=== Unrivaled ===
On October 29, 2024, it was announced that Edwards would appear and play in the inaugural 2025 season of Unrivaled, a women's 3-on-3 basketball league founded by Napheesa Collier and Breanna Stewart. In a 1v1 tournament, Edwards defeated Stewart, Allisha Gray, and Arike Ogunbowale before losing to Collier in the best-of-three finals. She played for Mist BC in the 2025 Unrivaled season.

On November 5, 2025, it was announced that Edwards had been drafted by Lunar Owls BC for the 2026 Unrivaled season.

== National team career ==
Edwards made her international debut with the Canadian junior national team at the 2017 FIBA Under-16 Women's Americas Championship, where she won a silver medal. She also joined the national team for the 2018 U17 FIBA World Cup and the 2019 U19 FIBA World Cup, where she was the youngest player on both teams.

In 2019, at age 16, Edwards made her senior national team debut at an exhibition tournament in Belgium. Later that year, she helped Canada secure a silver medal at the 2019 FIBA Women's AmeriCup. In November, Edwards helped Canada win the Americas pre-qualifying tournament for the 2020 Summer Olympics.

Edwards was once again the youngest member of the team for the 2021 FIBA Women's AmeriCup, where Canada finished fourth. In July 2021, she was named to team Canada's roster for the Tokyo Olympics. She was the team's youngest member. In the Olympic tournament, Edwards played only 31 seconds across two group stage games, as Canada failed to advance to the quarterfinals.

In the 2023 FIBA Women's AmeriCup, Edwards was one of the key players on the team that won bronze medals. Over the course of seven games, she averaged 26.4 minutes, 10.0 points, 8.0 rebounds, 2.6 assists, 1.3 steals, and 0.9 blocks per game.

In July 2024, Edwards was named to team Canada's roster for the 2024 Summer Olympics. In the Olympic tournament, she played in all three group stage games, averaging 3.3 points, 4.7 rebounds, 1.3 assists, and 1.3 steals in 20.8 minutes per game. Canada once again failed to progress to the quarterfinals.

== Career statistics ==
Legend
GP	Games played	GS	Games started	MPG	Minutes per game	RPG	Rebounds per game
APG	Assists per game	SPG	Steals per game	BPG	Blocks per game	PPG	Points per game
TO	Turnovers per game	FG%	Field-goal percentage	3P%	3-point field-goal percentage	FT%	Free-throw percentage
**Bold**	Career best	°	League leader

=== WNBA ===
==== Regular season ====
Stats current through end of 2026 season

WNBA regular season statistics
Year	Team	GP	GS	MPG	FG%	3P%	FT%	RPG	APG	SPG	BPG	TO	PPG
2024	Washington	**34**	17	**21.8**	.490	.000	.507	**5.6**	**1.4**	0.7	**0.8**	1.5	7.6
2025	Washington	21	0	13.3	.479	.000	.625	3.3	0.4	0.5	0.3	**1.1**	6.0
2025	Connecticut	15	0	17.0	.400	.000	.677	4.2	0.7	**0.9**	0.5	1.2	4.6
2026	Connecticut	30	**21**	20.6	**.518**	**.389**	**.728**	4.7	1.0	0.8	0.3	1.7	**11.1**
**Career**	3 years, 2 teams	100	38	18.9	.491	.206	.676	4.6	1.0	0.7	0.5	1.4	7.8

=== College ===
NCAA statistics
Year	Team	GP	GS	MPG	FG%	3P%	FT%	RPG	APG	SPG	BPG	TO	PPG
2020–21	UConn	29	6	21.8	**.689**	—	.636	5.7	0.9	1.0	1.0	**2.0**	10.7
2021–22	UConn	36	26	24.9	.521	.400	.740	5.1	1.4	1.1	0.5	2.1	7.9
2022–23	UConn	**37**	**37**	**32.5**	.589	**1.000**	**.773**	9.0	**2.4**	1.2	**1.1**	3.0	16.6
2023–24	UConn	**37**	**37**	30.3	.593	.000	.747	**9.2**	2.1	**1.7**	1.0	2.5	**17.6**
**Career**		139	106	27.7	.593	.333	.736	7.3	1.8	1.3	0.9	2.4	13.4

== Personal life ==
Edwards was born in Kingston, Ontario, to Jacqueline and Stanford Edwards. She wears purple and yellow braids to pay homage to the Los Angeles Lakers and Kobe Bryant, and her late brother Jermaine. She is of Jamaican descent. Edwards is a vegetarian.

== Awards and honors ==
- Big East All-Tournament team (2023)
- AP Third Team All-American (2023)
