= Mamignan Touré =

French basketball player (born 1994)

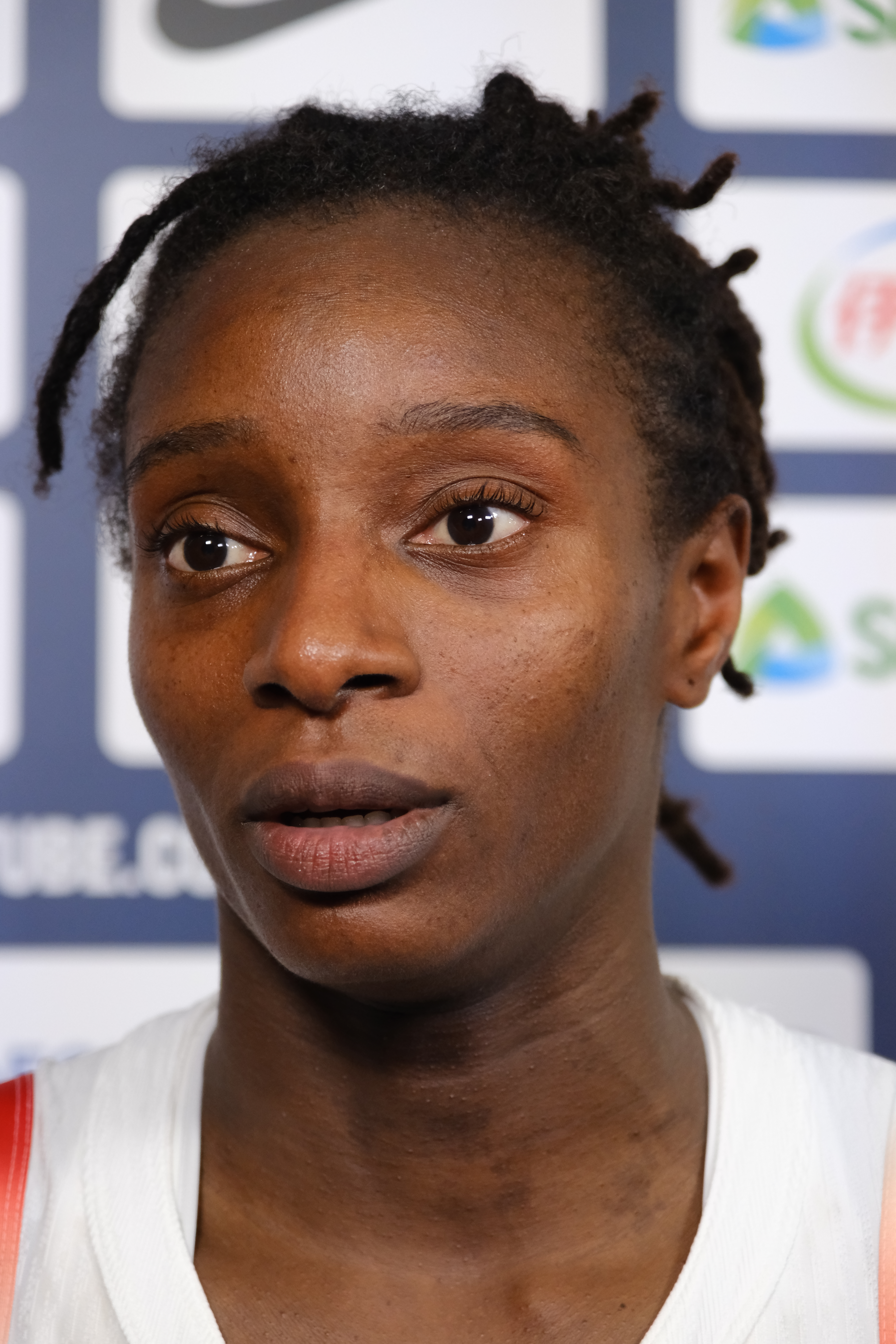
- Touré with the French national team in June 2025

No. 28 – Beşiktaş
- Position: Shooting guard
- League: Turkish Super League

Personal information
- Born: 19 December 1994 (age 31) Nevers, France
- Listed height: 6 ft 0 in (1.83 m)

Career information
- Playing career: 2012–present

Career history
- 2012–2014: Arras PABF
- 2014–2015: Léon Trégor B29
- 2015–2016: ASVEL Lyon-Villeurbanne
- 2016–2018: Cavigal Nice
- 2018–2020: Basket Landes
- 2020–2021: Castors Braine
- 2021–2024: Lattes Montpellier
- 2024–2025: Uni Girona
- 2025: Connecticut Sun
- 2025: Žabiny Brno
- 2025–present: Beşiktaş

Career highlights
- Coupe de Belgique (2020); Coupe de France (2021)
- Stats at Basketball Reference
Medals
Women's basketball
Representing France
FIBA World Cup
Silver medal – second place	2026 Germany
EuroBasket Women
Bronze medal – third place	2023 Israel/Slovenia
Women's 3x3 basketball
Representing France
World Cup
Gold medal – first place	2019 Debrecen
Bronze medal – third place	2021 Paris

Mamignan "Migna" Touré (born 19 December 1994) is a French professional basketball player for the Connecticut Sun of the Women's National Basketball Association (WNBA) and for Beşiktaş of the Turkish Super League.

== Professional career ==
=== Europe ===
After two years in Arras's Ligue 2, Touré signed with Léon Trégor B29 in summer 2014. After a successful 2014-2015 season (14.1 points and 4.3 rebounds), cut short by a meniscus injury, she returned to the elite ranks by signing with ASVEL Lyon-Villeurbanne in May 2015.

Under the direction of Marina Maljković, Touré averaged 4.7 points and 1.8 rebounds, with a 2.5 efficiency rating. She signed with Cavigal Nice for the 2016-2017 season, which successfully retained its place in the Ligue 2.

Touré joined Basket Landes for the 2018-2019 LFB season. After two seasons in the Landes region (9.4 points at 38% from 2-point range, 20% from 3-point range, 2.4 rebounds, and 2.2 assists for an average rating of 5.4 in 27 minutes of play), she signed in April 2020 with the Belgian club Castors Braine, but she left Belgium in November when Braine withdrew from the EuroLeague to play only the EuroCup. She then signed with Lattes Montpellier.

Touré signed with BK Brno of the Czech Women's Basketball League for the 2025–26 season. However, she left the team after Brno failed to qualify to 2025–26 EuroLeague Women, and signed with Beşiktaş of the Turkish Super League.

=== WNBA ===
On 21 April 2025, Touré was signed to training camp contract with the Golden State Valkyries of the Women's National Basketball Association. On 14 May, she was waived by the Valkyries.

==== Connecticut Sun ====
On 21 July 2025, Touré signed a seven-day contract with the Connecticut Sun.

== National team career ==
In the summer 2013, Touré won the silver medal at the World Championship with the French national U19 team.

With the French U20 national team, Touré won gold against Spain in July 2014. In the group match against Turkey, she made five of five three-point attempts (18 points) in the second half of a game in which Les Bleues trailed by as many as 24 points before winning 52-50.

In June 2019, Touré was selected for the French 3x3 team, which finished third at the World Cup. In May 2021, Touré was a member of the French 3x3 team that qualified for the Tokyo Olympics and finished fourth. She was pre-selected for the EuroBasket Women 2023 qualifying matches in November 2021.

== Career statistics ==
Legend
GP	Games played	GS	Games started	MPG	Minutes per game	RPG	Rebounds per game
APG	Assists per game	SPG	Steals per game	BPG	Blocks per game	PPG	Points per game
TO	Turnovers per game	FG%	Field-goal percentage	3P%	3-point field-goal percentage	FT%	Free-throw percentage
**Bold**	Career best	°	League leader

=== WNBA ===
==== Regular season ====
Stats current through end of 2025 season

WNBA regular season statistics
Year	Team	GP	GS	MPG	FG%	3P%	FT%	RPG	APG	SPG	BPG	TO	PPG
2025	Connecticut	18	0	8.2	.359	.364	.000	0.4	0.5	0.4	0.0	0.4	2.0
**Career**	1 year, 1 team	18	0	8.2	.359	.364	.000	0.4	0.5	0.4	0.0	0.4	2.0
