= 2026 Connecticut Sun season =

- Head coach: Rachid Meziane
- Arena: Mohegan Sun Arena; PeoplesBank Arena; TD Garden

Results
- Record: 11–33 (.250)
- Place: 7th (Eastern)
- Playoff finish: Did not qualify

The 2026 Connecticut Sun season was the 28th season for the franchise of the Women's National Basketball Association that was established in 1999 as the Orlando Miracle, their 24th as the Connecticut Sun, and the second under head coach Rachid Meziane. This also was the final season for the franchise in Connecticut, as in following the season, the team relocated to Houston to revive the Houston Comets.

== Draft ==
The draft was held on April 13, 2026, at 7:30 pm EDT, and was broadcast on ESPN.

Round	Pick	Player	Position	Nationality	College/Club	Outcome	Ref.
1	12	Nell Angloma	Forward	France	Basket Lattes	Signed four-year rookie contract	
1	15	Gianna Kneepkens	Guard	United States	UCLA Bruins	Signed four-year rookie contract	
2	18	Charlisse Leger-Walker	Guard	New Zealand	UCLA Bruins	Signed four-year rookie contract	
3	33	Serah Williams	Center	United States	UConn Huskies	Rights traded to Portland Fire	

== Transactions ==
=== Front office and coaching ===
Date	Details	Ref.

=== Trades ===
April
April 13	To Connecticut Sun Taylor Bigby; 2027 third-round draft pick	To Portland Fire Serah Williams

== Roster ==
Connecticut Sun roster
Players
Coaches

Pos.	No.	Nat.	Name	Height	Weight	DOB	From	Yrs
F	33	(France)	Angloma, Nell	6' 1" (1.85m)		2006-06-12	France	R
F	15	(United States)	Beers, Raegan	6' 4" (1.93m)	244 lb (111kg)	2004-07-23	Oklahoma	R
G/F	25	(United States)	Burke, Kennedy (injured)	6' 1" (1.85m)	199 lb (90kg)	1997-02-14	UCLA	6
F	8	(Canada)	Edwards, Aaliyah	6' 3" (1.91m)	206 lb (93kg)	2002-07-09	Connecticut	2
C	42	(United States)	Griner, Brittney (injured)	6' 9" (2.06m)	219 lb (99kg)	1990-10-18	Baylor	11
G	3	(United States)	Jackson, Ashlon	6' 0" (1.83m)	170 lb (77kg)	2004-01-06	Duke	R
G	5	(United States)	Kneepkens, Gianna	5' 11" (1.8m)	174 lb (79kg)	2003-03-04	UCLA	R
G	47	(France)	Lacan, Leïla	5' 11" (1.8m)		2004-06-02	France	1
G	4	(New Zealand)	Leger-Walker, Charlisse	5' 10" (1.78m)	190 lb (86kg)	2001-09-15	UCLA	R
F	1	(United States)	Miller, Diamond	6' 1" (1.85m)	178 lb (81kg)	2001-02-11	Maryland	3
C	10	(United States)	Nelson-Ododa, Olivia (injured)	6' 5" (1.96m)	179 lb (81kg)	2000-08-17	Connecticut	3
G	22	(United States)	Rivers, Saniya (injured)	6' 1" (1.85m)	159 lb (72kg)	2003-03-04	NC State	1
G	2	(United States)	Van Lith, Hailey	5' 9" (1.75m)	157 lb (71kg)	2001-09-09	TCU	1

Head coach
(France) Rachid Meziane
Assistant coaches
(Belgium) Pascal Angillis
(United States) Roneeka Hodges (Florida State)
(United States) Ashlee McGee (Austin Peay)
Player development
(United States) Kevin Owens (Trinity University)
(United States) Bak Sawi (Allegany College of Maryland)
Athletic trainer
(United States) Terri Acosta (North Texas)
Assistant trainer
(United States) Brianna Robinson (FIU)
Strength and conditioning coach
(United States) Analisse Rios (Connecticut College)

Legend

- (C) Team captain
- (DP) Unsigned draft pick
- (FA) Free agent
- (S) Suspended
- Injured

WNBA roster page

East
ATL
CHI
CON
IND
NY
TOR
WAS
West
DAL
GS
LV
LA
MIN
PHO
POR
SEA

=== Depth chart ===
Pos.	Starter	Bench
PG	Leïla Lacan	Charlisse Leger-Walker; Hailey Van Lith
SG	Saniya Rivers	Ashlon Jackson; Gianna Kneepkens
SF	Kennedy Burke	Nell Angloma; Diamond Miller
PF	Aneesah Morrow	Raegan Beers; Aaliyah Edwards
C	Brittney Griner	Olivia Nelson-Ododa

== Schedule ==
=== Preseason ===
2026 pre-season game log
Total: 1–1 (Home: 0–1; Road: 1–0)
April / May: 1–1 (Home: 0–1; Road: 1–0)

Game	Date	Team	Score	High points	High rebounds	High assists	Location Attendance	Record
1	April 29	@ Toronto	W 83–78	Aneesah Morrow (21)	Aneesah Morrow (7)	Charlisse Leger-Walker (4)	Coca-Cola Coliseum; 8,210	1–0
2	May 3	New York	L 67–79	Brittney Griner (16)	Aneesah Morrow (8)	Burke, Rivers (4)	Mohegan Sun Arena; 5.218	1–1

2026 pre-season schedule

=== Regular season ===
2026 game log
Total: 11–33 (Home: 8–14; Road: 3–19)
May: 2–8 (Home: 1–3; Road: 1–5)

Game	Date	Team	Score	High points	High rebounds	High assists	Location Attendance	Record
1	May 8	@ New York	L 75–106	Diamond Miller (16)	Griner, Morrow (6)	Saniya Rivers (6)	Barclays Center; 17,615	0–1
2	May 10	Seattle	L 82–89	Aneesah Morrow (17)	Aneesah Morrow (16)	Kennedy Burke (5)	Mohegan Sun Arena; 7,374	0–2
3	May 13	Las Vegas	L 69–98	Aneesah Morrow (16)	Aneesah Morrow (11)	Kennedy Burke (5)	Mohegan Sun Arena; 5,452	0–3
4	May 15	Las Vegas	L 94–101	Hailey Van Lith (17)	Aneesah Morrow (10)	Saniya Rivers (7)	Mohegan Sun Arena; 7,265	0–4
5	May 18	@ Portland	82–83	Brittney Griner (16)	Aneesah Morrow (12)	Saniya Rivers (6)	Moda Center; 12,010	0–5
6	May 20	@ Seattle	W 80–78	Charlisse Leger-Walker (16)	Raegan Beers (8)	Edwards, Leger-Walker, Rivers (3)	Climate Pledge Arena; 9,024	1–5
7	May 22	@ Seattle	L 59–77	Diamond Miller (13)	Aaliyah Edwards (7)	Charlisse Leger-Walker (5)	Climate Pledge Arena; 9,741	1–6
8	May 25	@ Golden State	L 70–97	Aneesah Morrow (11)	Aneesah Morrow (10)	Olivia Nelson-Ododa (5)	Chase Center; 18,064	1–7
9	May 27	@ Portland	L 61–71	Aneesah Morrow (13)	Aneesah Morrow (13)	Olivia Nelson-Ododa (4)	Moda Center; 11,945	1–8
10	May 30	Los Angeles	W 84–81	Aneesah Morrow (17)	Aneesah Morrow (14)	Saniya Rivers (4)	PeoplesBank Arena; 10,478	2–8

June : 2–7 (Home: 2–4; Road: 0–3)

Game	Date	Team	Score	High points	High rebounds	High assists	Location Attendance	Record
11	June 2	@ Atlanta	L 75–91	Aneesah Morrow (20)	Aneesah Morrow (13)	Leïla Lacan (5)	Gateway Center Arena; 3,575	2–9
12	June 5	@ Chicago	L 80–85	Griner, Miller (16)	Aneesah Morrow (17)	Brittney Griner (5)	Wintrust Arena; 6,594	2–10
13	June 8	New York	L 80–89	Edwards, Nelson-Ododa (15)	Olivia Nelson-Ododa (8)	Leïla Lacan (7)	Mohegan Sun Arena	2–11
14	June 10	@ Toronto	L 102–106 (OT)	Edwards, Lacan (24)	Olivia Nelson-Ododa (13)	Lacan, Rivers (7)	Coca-Cola Coliseum; 8,210	2–12
15	June 13	Indiana	L 75–85	Olivia Nelson-Ododa (12)	Olivia Nelson-Ododa (7)	Leïla Lacan (7)	Mohegan Sun Arena; 8,910	2–13
16	June 17	Washington	L 81–88	Lacan, Morrow (11)	Aneesah Morrow (10)	Lacan, Leger-Walker (4)	Mohegan Sun Arena; 6,943	2–14
17	June 19	Toronto	L 97–101	Kennedy Burke (18)	Aneesah Morrow (10)	Morrow, Rivers (4)	Gateway Center Arena; 7,078	2–15
18	June 22	Chicago	W 92–63	Brittney Griner (14)	Olivia Nelson-Ododa (15)	Charlisse Leger-Walker (5)	Mohegan Sun Arena; 7,036	3–15
19	June 26	Washington	W 68–57	Lacan, Nelson-Ododa (12)	Olivia Nelson-Ododa (9)	Lacan, Leger-Walker (5)	Mohegan Sun Arena; 7,789	4–15

July : 3–7 (Home: 1–3; Road: 2–4)

Game	Date	Team	Score	High points	High rebounds	High assists	Location Attendance	Record
20	July 2	Dallas	L 83–86	Leïla Lacan (18)	Brittney Griner (11)	Leïla Lacan (5)	PeoplesBank Arena; 14,578	4–16
21	July 6	@ Minnesota	W 90–89	Brittney Griner (29)	Brittney Griner (10)	Charlisse Leger-Walker (5)	Target Center; 10,810	5–16
22	July 8	Minnesota	L 80–86	Leïla Lacan (15)	Nell Angloma (7)	Leïla Lacan (6)	Mohegan Sun Arena; 8,187	5–17
23	July 10	Golden State	L 64–79	Diamond Miller (14)	Olivia Nelson-Ododa (8)	Leïla Lacan (6)	Mohegan Sun Arena; 8,546	5–18
24	July 14	Portland	W 90–87	Aaliyah Edwards (21)	Aaliyah Edwards (8)	Charlisse Leger-Walker (7)	Mohegan Sun Arena; 8,917	6–18
25	July 17	@ Phoenix	W 96–83	Leïla Lacan (26)	Aaliyah Edwards (7)	Charlisse Leger-Walker (7)	Mortgage Matchup Center; 10,321	7–18
26	July 19	@ Phoenix	L 63–72	Brittney Griner (19)	Olivia Nelson-Ododa (12)	Charlisse Leger-Walker (5)	Mortgage Matchup Center; 13,481	7–19
27	July 22	@ Indiana	L 88–123	Diamond Miller (15)	Aneesah Morrow (8)	Saniya Rivers (6)	Gainbridge Fieldhouse; 17,274	7–20
All-Star Game
28	July 28	@ Washington	L 84–92	Aneesah Morrow (21)	Olivia Nelson-Ododa (6)	Charlisse Leger-Walker (8)	CareFirst Arena; 4,200	7–21
29	July 30	@ Chicago	L 88–94	Aneesah Morrow (21)	Olivia Nelson-Ododa (11)	Leïla Lacan (6)	Wintrust Arena; 7,297	7–22

August : 3–8 (Home: 3–3; Road: 0–5)

Game	Date	Team	Score	High points	High rebounds	High assists	Location Attendance	Record
30	August 2	@ Dallas	L 63–83	Diamond Miller (22)	Olivia Nelson-Ododa (11)	Raegan Beers (3)	College Park Center; 6,251	7–23
31	August 7	Phoenix	W 75–72	Kennedy Burke (15)	Aaliyah Edwards (8)	Charlisse Leger-Walker (5)	Mohegan Sun Arena; 8,910	8–23
32	August 13	Atlanta	L 69–104	Aaliyah Edwards (15)	Brittney Griner (8)	Leïla Lacan (4)	Mohegan Sun Arena; 8,911	8–24
33	August 15	New York	L 75–82	Olivia Nelson-Ododa (21)	Olivia Nelson-Ododa (10)	Leïla Lacan (6)	Mohegan Sun Arena; 8,911	8–25
34	August 18	Los Angeles	W 85–77	Olivia Nelson-Ododa (18)	Olivia Nelson-Ododa (11)	Leïla Lacan (10)	TD Garden; 16,378	9–25
35	August 20	@ Las Vegas	L 78–101	Olivia Nelson-Ododa (14)	Saniya Rivers (7)	Saniya Rivers (5)	Michelob Ultra Arena; 10,207	9–26
36	August 22	@ Los Angeles	L 68–77	Saniya Rivers (14)	Raegan Beers (7)	Lacan, Leger-Walker (4)	Crypto.com Arena; 10,878	9–27
37	August 25	Chicago	W 87–81	Aaliyah Edwards (26)	Aaliyah Edwards (10)	Charlisse Leger-Walker (7)	Mohegan Sun Arena; 8,048	10–27
38	August 26	Golden State	L 64–89	Charlisse Leger-Walker (17)	Edwards, Van Lith (5)	Charlisse Leger-Walker (4)	Mohegan Sun Arena; 7,739	10–28
39	August 28	@ Indiana	L 91–111	Diamond Miller (19)	Nell Angloma (7)	Leger-Walker, Rivers (5)	Gainbridge Fieldhouse; 17,274	10–29
40	August 30	@ Dallas	L 71–97	Aaliyah Edwards (26)	Angloma, Edwards (6)	Charlisse Leger-Walker (5)	College Park Center; 6,251	10–30

September : 1–3 (Home: 1–1; Road: 0–2)

Game	Date	Team	Score	High points	High rebounds	High assists	Location Attendance	Record
41	September 17	@ Atlanta	L 59–103	Olivia Nelson-Ododa (13)	Saniya Rivers (9)	Charlisse Leger-Walker (3)	Gateway Center Arena; 3,575	10–31
42	September 20	Minnesota	L 89–101	Kneepkens, Lacan, Miller (15)	Edwards, Leger-Walker (5)	Charlisse Leger-Walker (8)	Mohegan Sun Arena; 8,911	10–32
43	September 22	@ Washington	L 69–79	Diamond Miller (19)	Aaliyah Edwards (13)	Angloma, Kneepkens, Lacan, Leger-Walker, Marshall (3)	CareFirst Arena; 4,200	10–33
44	September 24	Toronto	W 95–81	Ashlon Jackson (18)	Hailey Van Lith (9)	Hailey Van Lith (8)	Mohegan Sun Arena; 8,911	11–33

2026 season schedule

Notes:

- Games highlighted in represent Commissioner's Cup games.

== Standings ==
#	Team	W	L	PCT	GB	Conf.	Home	Road	Cup
1	y — Minnesota Lynx	33	11	.750	–	20–3	15–7	18–4	6–1
2	x — Golden State Valkyries	32	12	.727	1	15–8	17–5	15–7	5–2
3	x — Las Vegas Aces	31	13	.705	2	17–6	15–7	16–6	6–1
4	x — Atlanta Dream	30	14	.682	3	15–5	15–7	15–7	4–2
5	x — Washington Mystics	28	16	.636	5	15–5	15–7	13–9	3–3
6	x — Indiana Fever	28	16	.636	5	14–6	15–7	13–9	5–1
7	x — Dallas Wings	27	17	.614	6	13–10	16–6	11–11	4–3
8	cx – New York Liberty	26	18	.591	7	13–7	14–8	12–10	6–0
9	e — Portland Fire	17	27	.386	16	7–16	9–13	8–14	2–5
10	e — Phoenix Mercury	16	28	.364	17	10–13	7–15	9–13	2–5
11	e — Chicago Sky	16	28	.364	17	4–16	11–11	5–17	1–5
12	e — Los Angeles Sparks	16	28	.364	17	9–14	8–14	8–14	3–4
13	e — Toronto Tempo	11	33	.250	22	5–15	7–15	4–18	2–4
14	e — Connecticut Sun	11	33	.250	22	4–16	8–14	3–19	0–6
15	e — Seattle Storm	8	36	.182	25	1–22	6–16	2–20	0–7

Notes

(#) – League Standing
c – Commissioner's Cup winner
y – Regular season champion
x – Clinched playoff berth
e – Eliminated from playoff contention
Source: Overall standings and Commissioner's Cup Standings
