= Teonni Key =

American basketball player (born 2003)

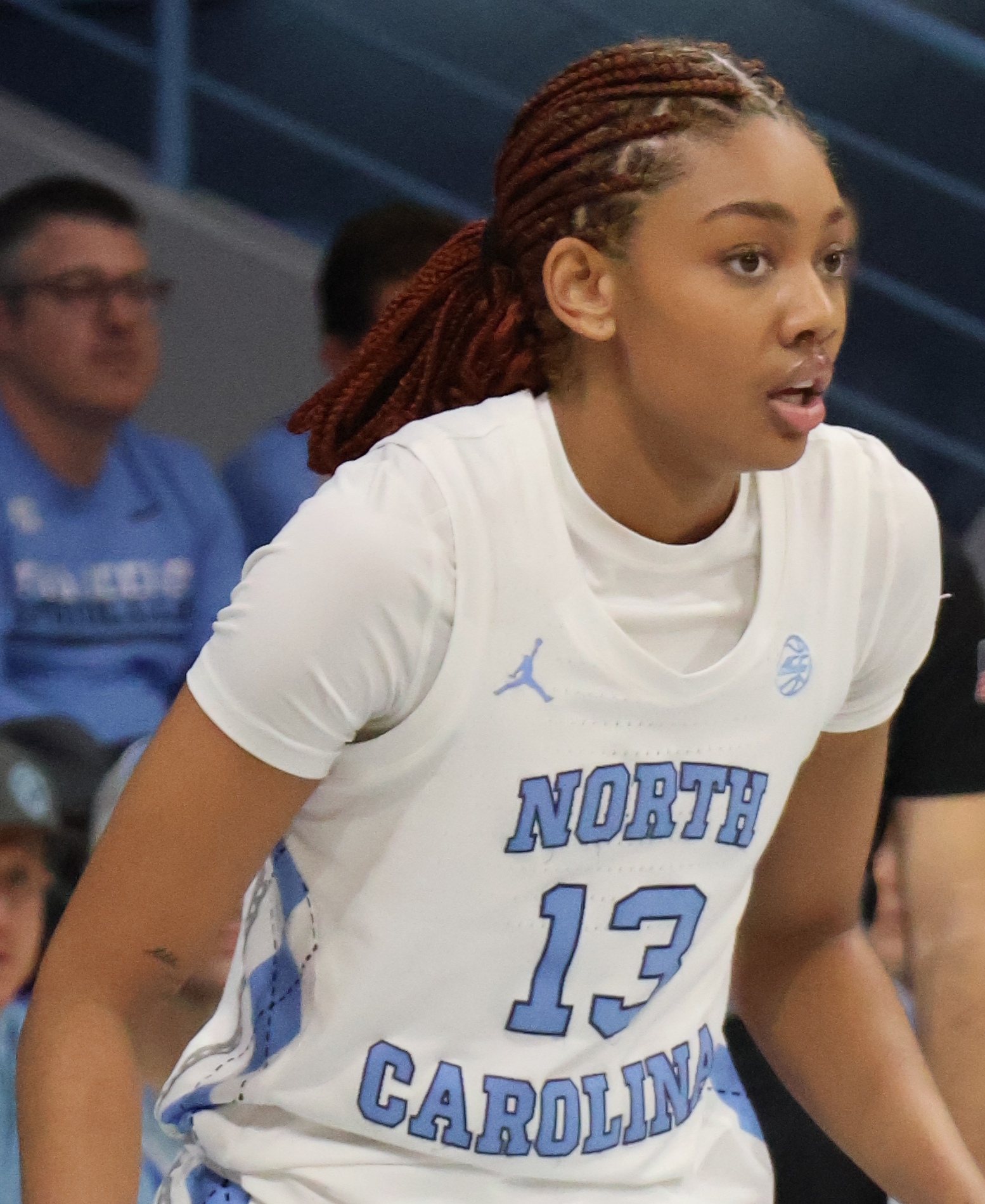
- Key with North Carolina in 2024

No. 7 – Perth Lynx
- Position: Forward
- League: WNBL

Personal information
- Born: July 10, 2003 (age 23)
- Listed height: 6 ft 4 in (1.93 m)
- Listed weight: 170 lb (77 kg)

Career information
- High school: Cary (Cary, North Carolina)
- College: North Carolina (2022–2024); Kentucky (2024–2026)
- WNBA draft: 2026: 2nd round, 22nd overall pick
- Drafted by: Toronto Tempo
- Playing career: 2026–present

Career history
- 2026–present: Toronto Tempo
- 2026–present: Perth Lynx

Career highlights
- McDonald's All-American (2021)
- Stats at Basketball Reference

Teonni Key (born July 10, 2003) is an American professional basketball player for the Perth Lynx of the Women's National Basketball League (WNBL). She is also contracted with the Toronto Tempo of the Women's National Basketball Association (WNBA). She played college basketball for the North Carolina Tar Heels and Kentucky Wildcats.

== High school career ==
Key attended Cary High School in Cary, North Carolina. She was ranked the No. 9 player in her class by ESPN and selected to compete in the 2021 McDonald's All-American Girls Game.

== College career ==
Key verbally committed to play college basketball at North Carolina on June 7, 2020. She sustained an ACL tear in preseason scrimmage and missed the 2021–22 season. During the 2022–23 season, in her red-shirt freshman year, she averaged 2.4 points and 2.4 rebounds per game. During the 2023–24 season, in her red-shirt sophomore year, she appeared in 23 games and averaged 2.7 points and 2.5 rebounds per games. She missed the first ten games of the season due to a lower body injury.

On April 15, 2024, she transferred to Kentucky. During the 2024–25 season, in her junior year, she averaged 11.4 points, 8.3 rebounds and 1.7 blocks per game. Her 1.7 blocks per game rank third in program history. She scored at least 10 points 22 times, at least 15 points seven times, and at least 20 points once during the season. On November 12, 2024, she recorded 11 points and 13 rebounds against Wofford for her first career double-double. During the 2025–26 season, in her senior year, she averaged 11.4 points, 7.5 rebounds and 1.3 blocks per game. On January 4, 2026, she suffered a dislocated elbow in a game against Missouri. She missed the next six games due to her injury. On February 5, 2026, in her return from injury, she scored a career-high 27, along with 12 rebounds, against Vanderbilt.

== Professional career ==
On April 13, 2026, Key was drafted in the second round, 22nd overall, by the Toronto Tempo in the 2026 WNBA draft.

On August 31, 2026, Key signed with the Perth Lynx of the Women's National Basketball League (WNBL) for the 2026–27 season.

== Career statistics ==
Legend
| GP | Games played | GS | Games started | MPG | Minutes per game | RPG | Rebounds per game |
| APG | Assists per game | SPG | Steals per game | BPG | Blocks per game | PPG | Points per game |
| TO | Turnovers per game | FG% | Field-goal percentage | 3P% | 3-point field-goal percentage | FT% | Free-throw percentage |
| **Bold** | Career best | ° | League leader |

=== WNBA ===
WNBA regular season statistics
| Year | Team | GP | GS | MPG | FG% | 3P% | FT% | RPG | APG | SPG | BPG | TO | PPG |
|---|---|---|---|---|---|---|---|---|---|---|---|---|---|
| 2026 | Toronto | 39 | 1 | 11.1 | .382 | .143 | .542 | 2.1 | .5 | .4 | .5 | .6 | 2.2 |
| **Career** | 1 year, 1 team | 39 | 1 | 11.1 | .382 | .143 | .542 | 2.1 | .5 | .4 | .5 | .6 | 2.2 |

=== College ===
| Year | Team | GP | GS | MPG | FG% | 3P% | FT% | RPG | APG | SPG | BPG | TO | PPG |
|---|---|---|---|---|---|---|---|---|---|---|---|---|---|
| 2022–23 | North Carolina | 28 | 1 | 10.1 | .373 | .000 | .590 | 2.4 | .3 | .3 | .4 | 1.3 | 2.4 |
| 2023–24 | North Carolina | 23 | 0 | 9.5 | .472 | .000 | .765 | 2.5 | .3 | .2 | .6 | **.7** | 2.7 |
| 2024–25 | Kentucky | **31** | **31** | **28.1** | .504 | **.244** | **.774** | **8.3** | **1.5** | **.9** | **1.7** | 2.6 | **11.4** |
| 2025–26 | Kentucky | 28 | 28 | 26.7 | **.512** | .133 | .698 | 7.5 | 1.2 | .7 | 1.3 | 2.0 | **11.4** |
| **Career** | | 110 | 60 | 19.3 | .492 | .197 | .712 | 5.4 | .9 | .6 | 1.0 | 1.7 | 7.3 |
Statistics retrieved from Sports-Reference.
