= 2021 McDonald's All-American Girls Game =

West	East
- Date: Cancelled

McDonald's All-American

The 2021 McDonald's All-American Girls Game was an all-star basketball game that was scheduled be held in 2021. The game's rosters featured the best and most highly recruited high school girls graduating in the class of 2021. The game would have been the 20th annual version of the McDonald's All-American Game first played in 2002. Due to the impact of the COVID-19 pandemic, the game was cancelled and the players were honored virtually. The 24 players were selected from over 700 nominees by a committee of basketball experts. They were chosen not only for their on-court skills, but for their performances off the court as well.

== Rosters ==
The roster was announced on February 23, 2021. South Carolina had the most selections with four, while North Carolina, Texas and UConn had three selections each.

ESPNW 100 Rank	Name	Height	Position	Hometown	High school	College choice
20	Destiny Adams	6–3	W	Whiting, New Jersey	Manchester Township High School	North Carolina
21	Clarice Akunwafo	6–5	P	Inglewood, California	Rolling Hills Preparatory	USC
16	Sonia Citron	6–1	G	Scarsdale, New York	Ursuline High School	Notre Dame
13	Maryam Dauda	6–4	P	Bentonville, Arkansas	Bentonville High School	Baylor
15	Amari DeBerry	6–5	F	Williamsville, New York	Williamsville South High School	UConn
11	Brooke Demetre	6–2	W	Foothill Ranch, California	Mater Dei High School	Stanford
5	Caroline Ducharme	5–10	G	Milton, Massachusetts	Noble and Greenough School	UConn
4	Sania Feagin	6–3	F	Ellenwood, Georgia	Forest Park High School	South Carolina
1	Azzi Fudd	5–11	G	Washington, D.C.	St. John's College High School	UConn
14	Bree Hall	5–11	G	Dayton, Ohio	Wayne High School	South Carolina
10	Rori Harmon	5–6	PG	Houston, Texas	Cypress Creek High School	Texas
37	Jillian Hollingshead	6–4	F	Marietta, Georgia	McEachern High School	Georgia
24	Kyndall Hunter	5–8	PG	Houston, Texas	Cypress Creek High School	Texas
19	Kiki Iriafen	6–2	F	North Hills, California	Harvard-Westlake School	Stanford
2	Raven Johnson	5–8	PG	Atlanta, Georgia	Westlake High School	South Carolina
32	Greta Kampschroeder	6–0	G	Naperville, Illinois	Naperville North High School	Oregon State
9	Teonni Key	6–3	W	Cary, North Carolina	Cary High School	North Carolina
27	Rayah Marshall	6–3	G	Los Angeles, California	Lynwood High School	USC
17	Kayla McPherson	5–7	PG	Hull, Georgia	Madison County High School	North Carolina
6	Aaliyah Moore	6–1	F	Moore, Oklahoma	Moore High School	Texas
34	Reigan Richardson	5–11	G	Huntersville, North Carolina	Cannon School	Georgia
3	Saniya Rivers	6–0	G	Wilmington, North Carolina	Eugene Ashley High School	South Carolina
12	Payton Verhulst	6–1	G	De Soto, Kansas	Bishop Miege High School	Louisville
7	Jersey Wolfenbarger	6–5	W	Fort Smith, Arkansas	Northside High School	Arkansas
