= Aneesah Morrow =

American basketball player (born 2003)

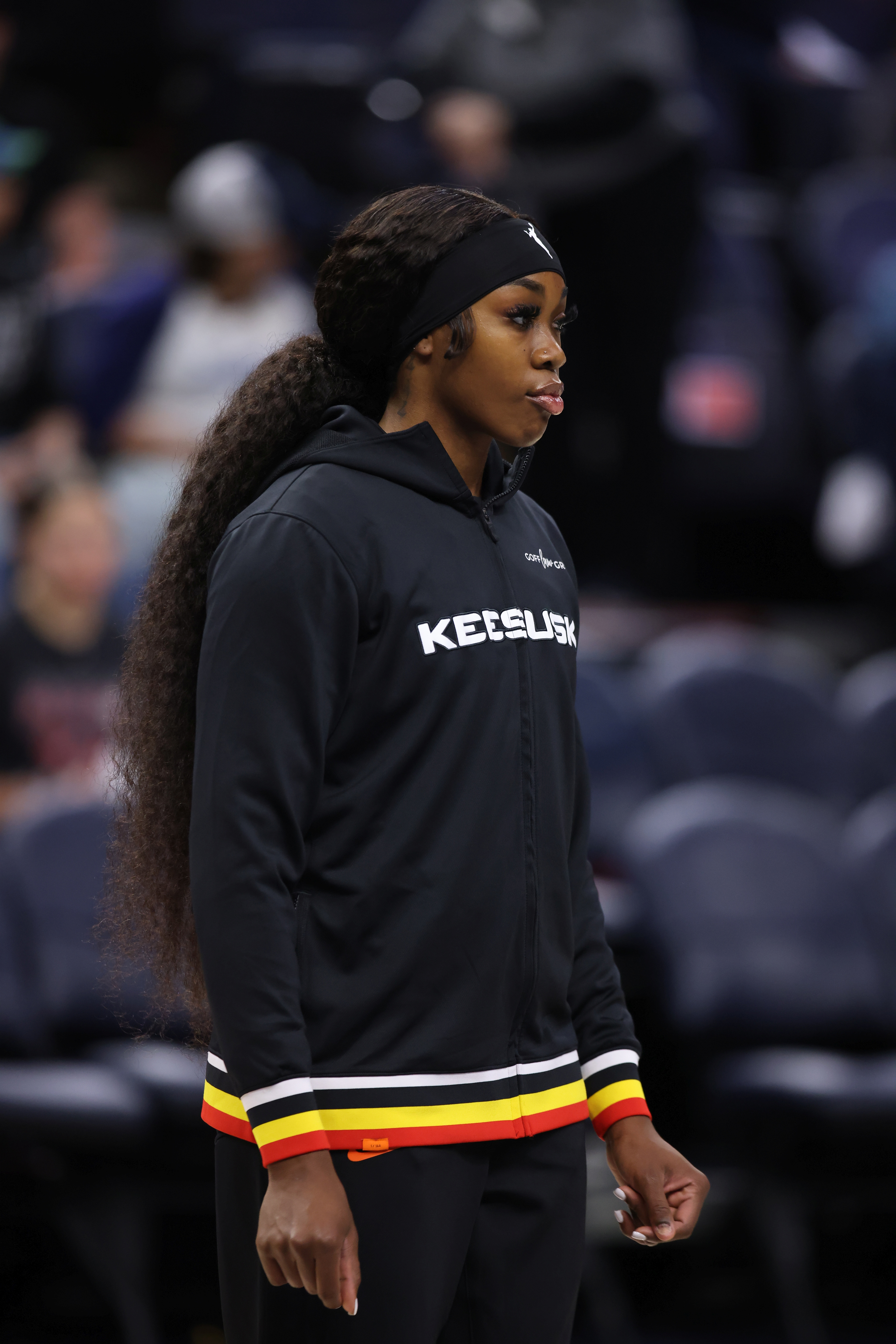
- Morrow with the Connecticut Sun in 2025

No. 24 – Toronto Tempo
- Position: Power forward
- League: WNBA

Personal information
- Born: February 2, 2003 (age 23) Chicago, Illinois, U.S.
- Listed height: 6 ft 1 in (1.85 m)
- Listed weight: 178 lb (81 kg)

Career information
- High school: Simeon Career Academy (Chicago, Illinois)
- College: DePaul (2021–2023); LSU (2023–2025)
- WNBA draft: 2025: 1st round, 7th overall pick
- Drafted by: Connecticut Sun
- Playing career: 2025–present

Career history
- 2025–2026: Connecticut Sun
- 2026–present: Toronto Tempo

Career highlights
- Katrina McClain Award (2025); WBCA Coaches' All-American (2025); 2× Second-team All-American – AP (2022, 2025); First-team All-American - USBWA (2025); Second-Team All-American – USBWA (2022); Third-team All-American – AP, USBWA (2023); USBWA National Freshman of the Year (2022); WBCA Freshman of the Year (2022); Big East Freshman of the Year (2022); 2× First-team All-SEC (2024, 2025); SEC All-Defensive Team (2025); 2× First-team All-Big East (2022, 2023); Big East All-Freshman Team (2022); 2× NCAA season rebounding leader (2022, 2025)
- Stats at Basketball Reference

Aneesah Morrow (born February 2, 2003) is an American professional basketball player for the Toronto Tempo of the Women's National Basketball Association (WNBA) and for Vinyl of Unrivaled. She previously played for the Connecticut Sun of the WNBA. She played college basketball for DePaul and LSU and was named the WBCA and USBWA National Freshman of the Year in 2022.

== High school career ==
Morrow attended Simeon Career Academy in Chicago, where she helped lead the Wolverines to their first city championship her freshman year. During her junior year, she averaged 23 points, 12.1 rebounds and 3.6 assists, and led them to a 35–2 record and the girls basketball program's first state championship in 2020. In her senior year she averaged 28.4 points, 14.3 rebounds, 4.6 assists, 2.9 steals and 2.3 blocks per game. Following the season she was named an All-State first team selection by the Associated Press, Champaign News-Gazette and the Illinois Basketball Coaches Association (IBCA).

== College career ==
=== DePaul ===
==== Freshman season ====
Morrow began her collegiate career during the 2021–22 season. In her first career game on November 9, 2021, she recorded 31 points and nine rebounds against Texas Southern. She was subsequently named Big East Freshman of the Week. In the week of December 12 she earned her first United States Basketball Writers Association (USBWA) National Freshman of the Week honor following an 18-point, 17-rebound game in DePaul's 94–85 upset against then-No. 14 Kentucky. On January 30, 2022, she scored 22 points and recorded a Big East single-game record 27 rebounds, surpassing the previous record of 26 set by Peggy Walsh in 1986. In the regular-season finale on February 27 at Creighton, she scored a career-high 41 points and added 18 rebounds. The 41 points was a Big East rookie record, and one point shy of the program's all time single-game scoring record set by Beth Hasenmiller in 1991. She subsequently earned her record thirteenth Big East Freshman of the Week, and fifth National Freshman of Week honor, surpassing the previous record of four set by Caitlin Clark and Paige Bueckers.

She averaged a double-double with 21.9 points and 13.8 rebounds a game, and led the nation in total rebounds (457), rebounds per game (13.8) and offensive rebounds per game (5.8) and ranked second in the nation in double-doubles (27). She also had a streak of 23 consecutive double-doubles, which ended during the quarterfinals of the 2022 Big East tournament in a 85–105 loss to Marquette. She became the fifth player in NCAA women's basketball history to record more than 20 consecutive double-doubles in a season. Following an outstanding season, she was named a unanimous selection to the All-Big East first team, and All-Freshman team, and was named Big East Freshman of the Year. She was also named USBWA National Freshman of the Year, and WBCA Freshman of the Year. She was named a second-team All-American by Sports Illustrated, The Athletic, the Associated Press, and USBWA. She became the first All-American in program history.

==== Sophomore season ====
During the 2022–23 season, in her sophomore year, she was one of the top forwards in women's basketball, and averaged a double-double with 25.7 points and 12.2 rebounds per game. She ranked fourth in the nation in points and sixth in the nation in rebounding. She also ranked third in the nation with 25 double-doubles in 33 games. With 848 points this season, Morrow set the program's single season scoring record, surpassing the previous record of 804 points set by Diana Vines' in the 1988–89 season. Following an outstanding season she was named a finalist for the Katrina McClain Award and named a third-team All-American by the Associated Press and USBWA.

=== LSU ===
==== Junior season ====
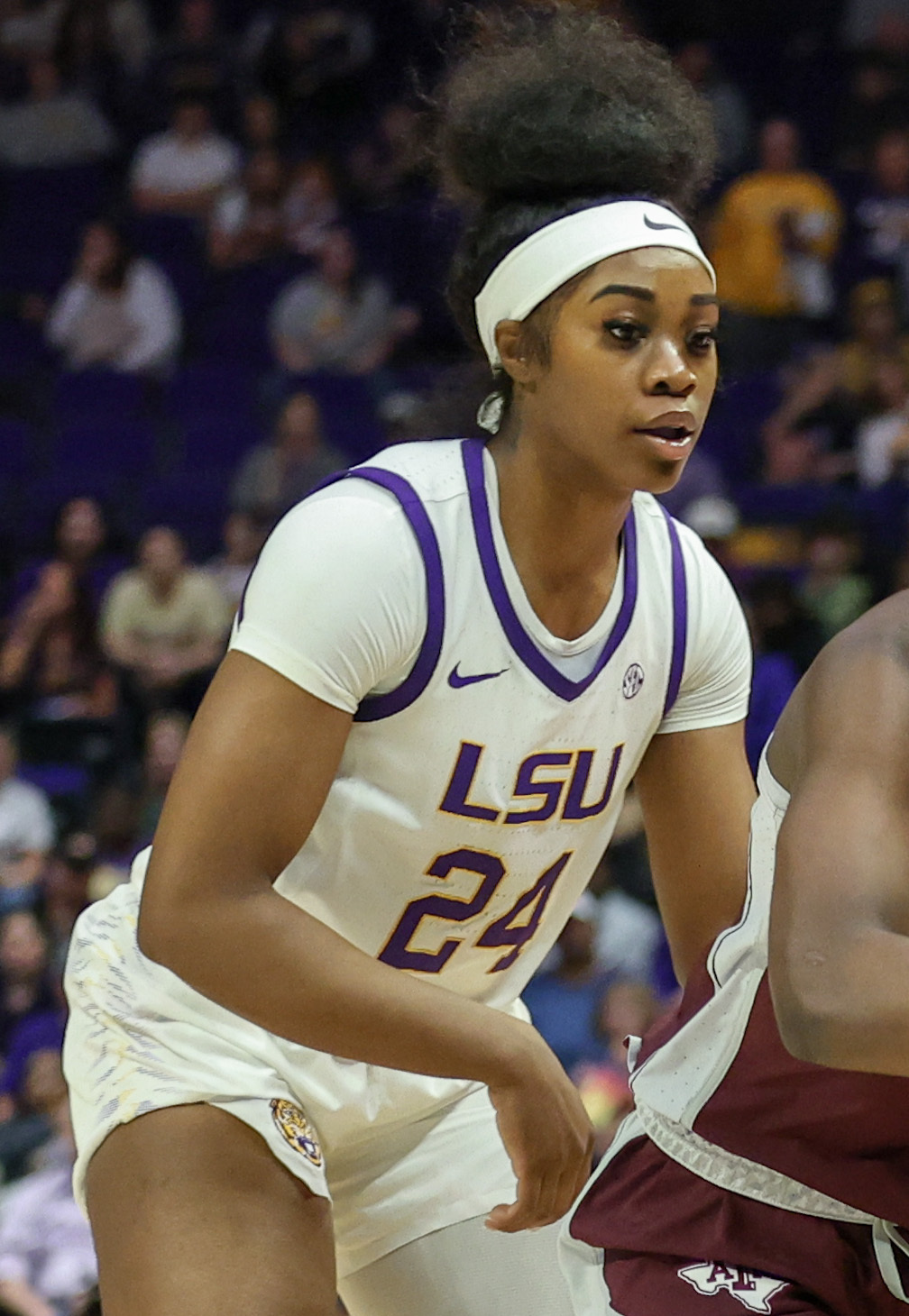
Morrow with LSU in 2024

On May 5, 2023, Morrow announced she was transferring to LSU. On November 7, 2023, Morrow started in the first game of the season, recording six points and four rebounds, as the preseason No. 1 Tigers were upset 78–92 by No. 20 Colorado. She moved to the bench for the next three games, but returned to the starting lineup in a game at Southeastern Louisiana in Angel Reese's absence. Morrow had a memorable performance at the 2023 Cayman Islands Classic, where LSU was still missing Reese, and in the early moments of the first game, another starting forward, Sa'Myah Smith, was lost to injury. In the first game, she recorded 28 points, 10 rebounds, and five steals in a 99-65 win against Niagara. In the second game, she led the Tigers with 37 points and 16 rebounds in a 76–73 win over Virginia. Following these performances, she was named AP and ESPN's Player of the Week, as well as the SEC Player of the Week and was included in the USBWA Ann Meyers Drysdale National Player of the Week team. LSU finished second in the SEC regular season with a 13–3 record and advanced to the finals of the 2024 SEC women's basketball tournament, where she was the top scorer of the team with 19 points in a 72–79 loss to South Carolina. With a 28–5 record, LSU earned the third seed in what was Morrow's first NCAA Tournament. In her tournament debut, she led the team in scoring with 15 points in their 70–60 first-round win against Rice. LSU advanced to the Elite Eight, where they lost 87–94 to Iowa. Following the season, she was named to First-team All-SEC, an Honorable Mention All-American by AP, USBWA, and WBCA, as well as a finalist for the Cheryl Miller Award.

==== Senior season ====
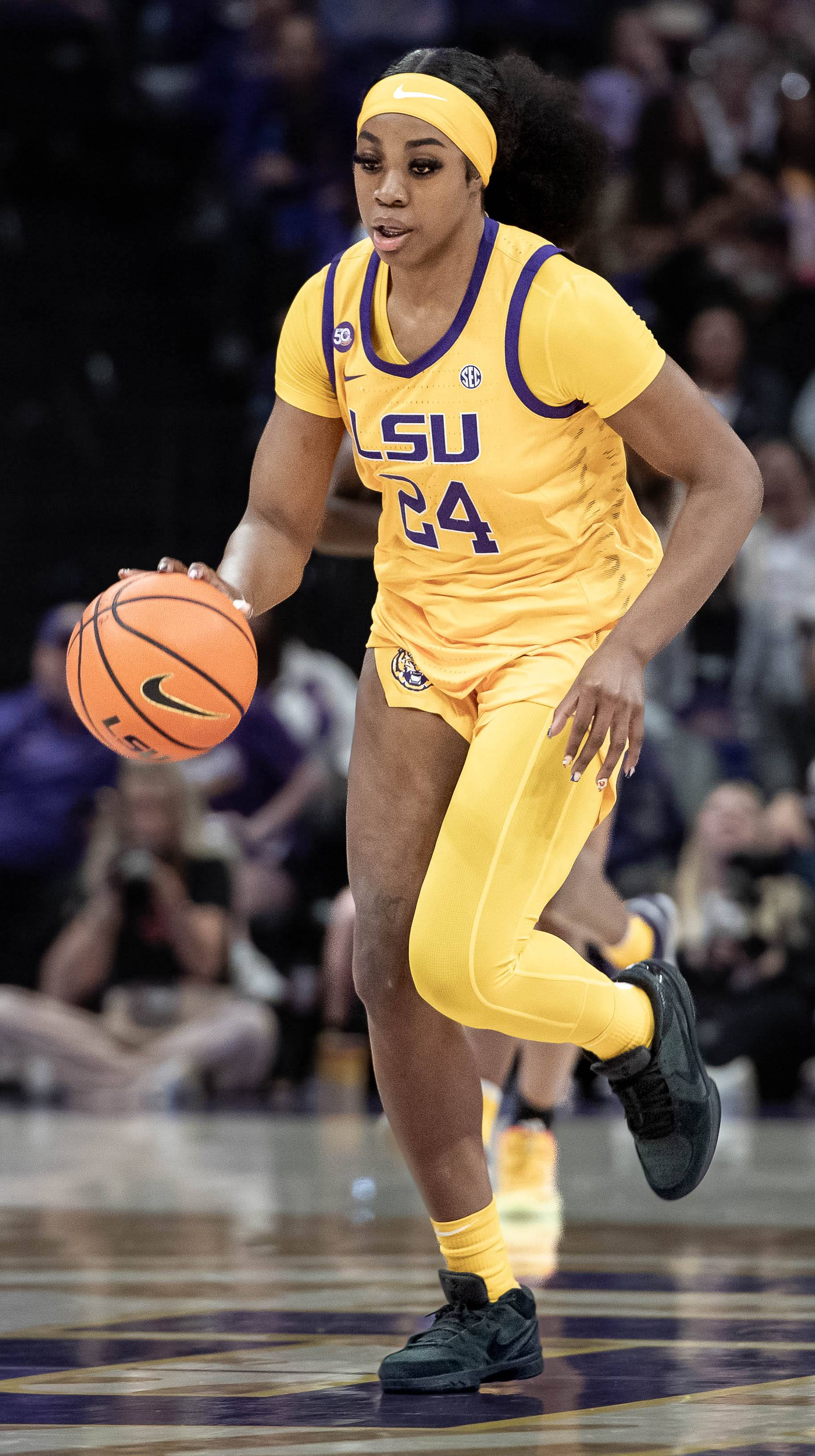
Morrow with LSU in 2025

On November 12, 2024, against Charleston Southern, Morrow recorded 21 points and 20 rebounds for her fourth career 20/20 game, and first with LSU. On January 9, 2025, against No. 16 Tennessee, she recorded 23 points and 21 rebounds, and surpassed 2,500 career points. This marked her 90th career double-double, tied for the third-most in NCAA Division I history. On January 13, 2025, against Vanderbilt, she recorded 23 points and 15 rebounds, and surpassed 1,500 career rebounds. She became the eighth player in NCAA history to reach 2,500 career points and 1,500 career rebounds. She was subsequently named the SEC Player of the Week. In February 2025, she missed the only game of her college career, sitting out against Georgia due to a foot injury. In the 2025 SEC women's basketball tournament, she led the Tigers to a quarterfinal win against Florida with 36 points and 14 rebounds. However, she was forced to leave the semifinal game against Texas in the third quarter after reaggravating her foot injury. She returned for the 2025 NCAA Tournament and led LSU with 30 points, 19 rebounds, three steals, and two blocks in their upset Sweet Sixteen win against NC State. She then recorded 15 points and seven rebounds in her last college game, as LSU lost their Elite Eight matchup against UCLA, 65–72. During the 2024–25 season, in her senior year, she averaged a double-double of 18.7 points and 13.5 rebounds per game. She led the nation in rebounds and with 30 double-doubles throughout the season, the second most ever by an LSU player. Her 485 rebounds were the fourth most in a season ever by an LSU player. Following the season she was named the Katrina McClain Award winner. She finished her collegiate career with 2,852 points and 1,714 rebounds, the third most rebounds in NCAA Division I history. She finished her career with 104 double-doubles, the second most in NCAA Division I history, and became only the second player to surpass 100 throughout their career.

On April 7, 2025, Morrow declared for the 2025 WNBA draft.

== Professional career ==
=== WNBA ===
==== Connecticut Sun (2025–2026) ====
On April 14, 2025, Morrow was drafted seventh overall by the Connecticut Sun in the 2025 WNBA draft. Knee pain sidelined her for most of the training camp and the start of the season. She made her debut on May 23, 2025, playing just 76 seconds in a 70–76 loss to the Minnesota Lynx. She made her first start on June 22, 2025, in a 63–87 loss to the Golden State Valkyries, recording 14 points and 4 rebounds in 15 minutes of play. On June 27, 2025, in a 81–97 loss to the Seattle Storm, she scored a career-high 20 points and 11 rebounds in 26 minutes off the bench for her first career double-double. She eventually became a regular starter, starting the final 21 games of the season. During the 2025 WNBA season, in her rookie season, she appeared in 41 games, starting 23, and averaged 7.7 points and 6.9 rebounds in 18.9 minutes per game.

During the 2026 WNBA season, in her second season with the Sun, she appeared in 20 games and averaged 11.6 points, 8.9 rebounds, and 1.7 assists in 23.2 minutes per game. She also recorded nine double-doubles. On July 28, 2026, in an 82–94 loss to the Washington Mystics, she scored a career-high 21 points. In her next game against the Chicago Sky on July 30, she scored a career-high tying 21 points in her final game with the Sun.

==== Toronto Tempo (2026–present) ====
On July 31, 2026, Morrow was traded to the Toronto Tempo in exchange for Maria Kliundikova and a second-round pick in the 2028 WNBA draft.

=== Athletes Unlimited ===
In September 2025, Morrow joined Athletes Unlimited Pro Basketball for its fifth season in Nashville, adding to her professional experience during her rookie year in the WNBA.

== Career statistics ==
Legend
GP	Games played	GS	Games started	MPG	Minutes per game	FG%	Field goal percentage	3P%	3-point field goal percentage
FT%	Free throw percentage	RPG	Rebounds per game	APG	Assists per game	SPG	Steals per game	BPG	Blocks per game
TO	Turnovers per game	PPG	Points per game	**Bold**	Career high	*	Led Division I

=== WNBA ===
WNBA regular season statistics
Year	Team	GP	GS	MPG	FG%	3P%	FT%	RPG	APG	SPG	BPG	TO	PPG
2025	Connecticut	**41**	**23**	18.9	.375	.240	**.758**	6.9	.5	.8	.4	**1.1**	7.7
2026	Connecticut	20	9	**23.2**	.421	**.284**	.625	**8.9**	**1.7**	**1.0**	.5	1.7	**11.6**
2026	Toronto	7	1	19.4	**.426**	.235	.682	6.6	.9	.7	**.6**	**1.1**	9.3
**Career**	2 years, 2 teams	68	33	20.2	.397	.258	.709	7.4	.9	.8	.5	1.3	9.0

=== College ===
Year	Team	GP	GS	MPG	FG%	3P%	FT%	RPG	APG	SPG	BPG	TO	PPG
2021–22	DePaul	33	33	30.4	**.519**	.233	.705	**13.8***	1.3	**2.7**	**1.8**	2.3	21.9
2022–23	DePaul	33	33	**35.1**	.425	.254	.646	12.2	**2.0**	2.6	1.3	2.9	**25.7**
2023–24	LSU	**37**	34	32.7	.464	.217	**.801**	10.0	1.7	2.5	1.1	**1.9**	16.4
2024–25	LSU	36	**36**	33.5	.490	**.289**	.734	13.5*	1.6	2.5	.6	2.1	18.7
Career		139	136	32.9	.470	.248	.717	12.3	1.7	2.6	1.2	2.3	20.5
Statistics retrieved from Sports-Reference.

== Personal life ==
Morrow's father, Edward, played linebacker at Nebraska, while her mother, Nafeesah, was an all-conference forward for Nebraska.
