= 2025 Connecticut Sun season =

- Head coach: Rachid Meziane
- Arena: Mohegan Sun Arena; TD Garden

Results
- Record: 11–33 (.250)
- Place: 6th (Eastern)
- Playoff finish: Did not qualify

The 2025 Connecticut Sun season was the 27th season for the Connecticut Sun franchise of the Women's National Basketball Association and the first under head coach, Rachid Meziane.

After the loss of head coach Stephanie White and the entire 2024 starting lineup in the offseason, Marina Mabrey made a request to be traded. However, Sun president Jennifer Rizzotti informed the media that they did not intend to honor Mabrey's request and rather plan "to build around her, have her here, have her be the catalyst for what we want to do offensively."

The Sun is the first team in WNBA history to lose its entire starting lineup between the last playoff game of the previous season and the start of a new season. No NBA team has had the same happen since starters were first tracked in the 1970–71 season. The Sun returned only 11.4% of its scoring from 2024, little more than a third of the next-lowest total of 30.3% by the Phoenix Mercury.

On May 12, 2025, Sportico reported that the team's owners, the Mohegan Native American tribe, had hired investment bank Allen & Company to explore options for outside investment in the franchise. The report noted that the "expectation is a control sale and likely franchise relocation." Rizzotti confirmed the report the next day. ESPN journalist Alexa Philippou would later remark that "what happens with the organization could be a defining storyline for the league in 2025."

== Draft ==
Round	Pick	Player	Position	Nationality	College/Club	Outcome	Ref.
1	7	Aneesah Morrow	F	United States	LSU	Signed rookie contract April 24; Made opening day roster	
1	8	Saniya Rivers	G	United States	NC State	Signed rookie contract April 21; Made opening day roster	
2	25	Rayah Marshall	F/C	United States	USC	Signed rookie contract April 17; Made opening day roster	

== Transactions ==
=== Front office and coaching ===
Date	Details	Ref.
November 6, 2024	Head coach, Stephanie White, left Sun organization	
December 3, 2024	Morgan Tuck hired as general manager	
December 3, 2024	Darius Taylor's role changed to Chief Basketball Strategist and Director of Scouting	
December 4, 2024	Hired Rachid Meziane as head coach	
January 10, 2025	Hired Roneeka Hodges as an assistant coach	
February 10, 2025	Hired Pascal Angillis and Ashlee McGee as assistant coaches	
March 12, 2025	Hired Chaz Franklin as Head of Player Development	
March 12, 2025	Hired Kevin Owens as Player Development Coach and Video Coordinator	
March 12, 2025	Hired Bak Sawi as Player Development Coach	
March 12, 2025	Hired Kristen Mann as Manager of Basketball Development	
March 12, 2025	Hired Kristina Beauchais as Manager of Basketball Operations	
March 12, 2025	Hired Shavonte Zellous as Basketball Development Intern	
May 16, 2025	Darius Taylor left Sun organization	

=== Trades ===
February
February 2 (Four-team trade)	To Connecticut Sun Rebecca Allen and Natasha Cloud (from Phoenix Mercury); Jacy Sheldon (from Dallas Wings); 2025 No. 8 draft pick (from Indiana Fever)	To Dallas Wings DiJonai Carrington and Tyasha Harris (from Connecticut Sun); NaLyssa Smith and right to swap third round picks in 2027 draft (from Indiana Fever); Rights to Mikiah Herbert Harrigan and the 2025 No. 12 pick (from Phoenix Mercury)
February 2 (Four-team trade)	To Indiana Fever Sophie Cunningham and the 2025 No. 19 pick (from Phoenix Mercury); Jaelyn Brown (from Dallas Wings)	To Phoenix Mercury Alyssa Thomas (from Connecticut Sun); Satou Sabally, Kalani Brown, and Sevgi Uzun (from Dallas Wings)
February 4	To Connecticut Sun Lindsay Allen; Rights to Nikolina Milić	To Chicago Sky Rebecca Allen
March
March 16	To Connecticut Sun 2025 No. 7 draft pick 2026 first round draft pick	To New York Liberty Natasha Cloud
August
August 7	To Connecticut Sun Aaliyah Edwards	To Washington Mystics Jacy Sheldon; Right to swap 2026 first round picks (Connecticut with New York's own and Washington with Minnesota's own acquired from prior trades)

=== Free agency ===
==== Core designation ====
Player	Date	Notes	Ref.
Alyssa Thomas	January 17	Traded to Phoenix Mercury on February 2	

==== Re-signed / activations ====
Player	Date	Notes	Ref.
Caitlin Bickle	January 22	Training camp contract	
Leïla Lacan	July 2	Set as active	

==== Additions ====
Player	Date	Notes	Former Team	Ref.
Jacy Sheldon	February 2	Rookie contract (2024 draft pick - No. 5)	Dallas Wings	
Tina Charles	February 2	One-year deal	Atlanta Dream	
Diamond DeShields	February 3	One-year deal	Chicago Sky	
Mya Hollingshed	February 4	Training camp contract	Bodrum Basketbol	
Robyn Parks	February 4	Training camp contract	Emlak Konut	
Yvonne Anderson	February 6	Two-year deal	CBK Mersin	
Leïla Lacan	February 8	Rookie contract (2024 draft pick – No. 10)	Basket Landes	
Kariata Diaby	February 13	Training camp contract	Tango Bourges Basket	
Amy Okonkwo	February 13	Training camp contract	Tango Bourges Basket	
Abbey Hsu	February 17	Rookie contract (2024 draft pick - No. 34)	Columbia Lions	
Kamila Borkowska	February 24	Training camp contract	Zagłębie Sosnowiec	
Haley Peters	February 24	Training camp contract	Villeneuve-d'Ascq	
Haley Peters	July 15	7-day contract	Free agent	
Haley Peters	July 22	7-day contract	Free agent	
Haley Peters	July 29	7-day contract	Free agent	
Haley Peters	August 5	Rest of season contract	Free agent	
Rayah Marshall	April 17	Rookie contract (2025 draft pick – No. 25)	USC Trojans	
Madison Hayes	April 21	Training camp contract	NC State Wolfpack	
Morgan Maly	April 21	Training camp contract	Creighton Bluejays	
Saniya Rivers	April 21	Rookie contract (2025 draft pick – No. 8)	NC State Wolfpack	
Aneesah Morrow	April 24	Rookie contract (2025 draft pick – No. 7)	LSU Tigers	
Bria Hartley	May 11	Training camp contract	Athletes Unlimited	
Jaelyn Brown	June 2	Rest of season contract	Dallas Wings	
Mamignan Touré	July 21	7-day contract	Spar Girona	
Mamignan Touré	July 28	7-day contract	Spar Girona	
Mamignan Touré	August 4	7-day contract	Spar Girona	

=== Subtractions / unsigned ===
Player	Date	Reason	New Team	Ref.
Nikolina Milić	—	Free agency – reserved (qualifying offer extended)	—	
Veronica Burton	December 6	Expansion draft	Golden State Valkyries	
Brionna Jones	February 1	Free agency – uncoreable unrestricted	Atlanta Dream	
DeWanna Bonner	February 5	Free agency – uncoreable unrestricted	Indiana Fever	
Tiffany Mitchell	February 8	Free agency – unrestricted	Las Vegas Aces	
Astou Ndour-Fall	April 9	Free agency – unrestricted	Aguascalientes Panthers	
Morgan Maly	April 26	Waived	—	
Mya Hollingshed	April 28	Waived	—	
Abbey Hsu	April 28	Waived	—	
Caitlin Bickle	May 8	Waived	—	
Kamila Borkowska	May 8	Waived	—	
Madison Hayes	May 14	Waived	—	
Amy Okonkwo	May 14	Waived	—	
Yvonne Anderson	May 15	Waived	—	
Diamond DeShields	May 15	Waived	—	
Leïla Lacan	May 15	Suspended contract – temporary	N/A – retained rights	
Robyn Parks	June 2	Waived	—	
Kariata Diaby	July 2	Waived	—	
Jaelyn Brown	July 13	Waived	—	
Haley Peters	July 13	Waived	—	

== Roster ==
2025 Connecticut Sun roster
Players
Coaches

Pos.	No.	Nat.	Name	Height	Weight	DOB	From	Yrs
G	15	(United States)	Allen, Lindsay	5' 8" (1.73m)	145 lb (66kg)	1995-03-20	Notre Dame	7
C	31	(United States)	Charles, Tina	6' 4" (1.93m)	192 lb (87kg)	1988-12-05	Connecticut	13
F	8	(Canada)	Edwards, Aaliyah	6' 3" (1.91m)	174 lb (79kg)	2002-07-09	Connecticut	1
G	14	(United States)	Hartley, Bria (injured)	5' 9" (1.75m)	163 lb (74kg)	1992-09-30	Connecticut	9
G	47	(France)	Lacan, Leïla	5' 11" (1.8m)		2004-06-02	France	R
G	3	(United States)	Mabrey, Marina	5' 11" (1.8m)	170 lb (77kg)	1996-09-14	Notre Dame	6
F/C	13	(United States)	Marshall, Rayah	6' 4" (1.93m)		2003-11-15	USC	R
F	24	(United States)	Morrow, Aneesah	6' 1" (1.85m)		2003-02-02	LSU	R
C	10	(United States)	Nelson-Ododa, Olivia (injured)	6' 5" (1.96m)	176 lb (80kg)	2000-08-17	Connecticut	3
G/F	7	(United States)	Peters, Haley	6' 3" (1.91m)	178 lb (81kg)	2002-09-17	Duke	3
G	22	(United States)	Rivers, Saniya	6' 1" (1.85m)		2003-03-04	NC State	R
G	28	(France)	Touré, Mamignan	6' 0" (1.83m)		1994-12-19	France	R

Head coach
(France) Rachid Meziane
Assistant coaches
(Belgium) Pascal Angillis
(United States) Roneeka Hodges (Florida State)
(United States) Ashlee McGee (Austin Peay)
Player development
(United States) Kevin Owens (Trinity University)
Bak Sawi
Athletic trainer
(United States) Ryan Newton (Bridgewater State)
Assistant trainer
(United States) Jeanie Brookes (Central Oklahoma)
Strength and conditioning coach
(United States) Analisse Rios

Legend

- (C) Team captain
- (DP) Unsigned draft pick
- (FA) Free agent
- (S) Suspended
- Injured

=== Depth chart ===
Pos.	Starter	Bench
PG	Lindsay Allen	Saniya Rivers
SG	Bria Hartley	Leïla Lacan; Mamignan Touré
SF	Marina Mabrey	Aneesah Morrow; Haley Peters
PF	Olivia Nelson-Ododa	Aaliyah Edwards; Rayah Marshall
C	Tina Charles

== Schedule ==
=== Preseason ===
2025 pre-season game log
Total: 1–1 (Home: 0–0; Road: 1–1)
May: 1–1 (Home: 0–0; Road: 1–1)

Game	Date	Team	Score	High points	High rebounds	High assists	Location Attendance	Record
1	May 4	@ Seattle	L 59–79	Tina Charles (13)	Tied (4)	Tied (3)	Climate Pledge Arena; 7,153	0–1
2	May 9	@ New York	W 94–86	Tina Charles (17)	Olivia Nelson-Ododa (7)	Lindsay Allen (7)	Barclays Center; 8,395	1–1

2025 pre-season schedule

=== Regular season ===
2025 game log
Total: 11–33 (Home: 7–15; Road: 4–18)
May: 1–5 (Home: 0–3; Road: 1–2)

Game	Date	Team	Score	High points	High rebounds	High assists	Location Attendance	Record
1	May 18	Washington	L 85–90	Tina Charles (23)	Tina Charles (10)	Lindsay Allen (8)	Mohegan Sun Arena; 7,834	0–1
2	May 20	Las Vegas	L 62–87	Tina Charles (20)	Rayah Marshall (6)	Bria Hartley (5)	Mohegan Sun Arena; 8,179	0–2
3	May 23	@ Minnesota	L 70–76	Marina Mabrey (22)	Olivia Nelson-Ododa (10)	Marina Mabrey (6)	Target Center; 8,224	0–3
4	May 25	@ Atlanta	L 55–79	Marina Mabrey (12)	Marina Mabrey (10)	Marina Mabrey (4)	Gateway Center Arena; 3,265	0–4
5	May 27	Dallas	L 87–109	Tina Charles (27)	Tina Charles (6)	Jacy Sheldon (7)	Mohegan Sun Arena; 8,910	0–5
6	May 30	@ Indiana	W 85–83	Marina Mabrey (26)	Olivia Nelson-Ododa (9)	Saniya Rivers (6)	Gainbridge Fieldhouse; 16,213	1–5

June : 1–10 (Home: 1–3; Road: 0–7)

Game	Date	Team	Score	High points	High rebounds	High assists	Location Attendance	Record
7	June 1	@ New York	L 52–100	Jacy Sheldon (10)	Olivia Nelson-Ododa (5)	Haley Peters (3)	Barclays Center; 17,415	1–6
8	June 6	Atlanta	W 84–76	Marina Mabrey (34)	Saniya Rivers (5)	Bria Hartley (6)	Mohegan Sun Arena; 8,078	2–6
9	June 8	@ Washington	L 67–104	Tina Charles (17)	Tina Charles (9)	Marina Mabrey (8)	CareFirst Arena; 4,200	2–7
10	June 15	Chicago	L 66–78	Marina Mabrey (22)	Olivia Nelson-Ododa (10)	Bria Hartley (5)	Mohegan Sun Arena; 8,451	2–8
11	June 17	@ Indiana	L 71–88	Tina Charles (20)	Mabrey, Nelson-Ododa (8)	Saniya Rivers (5)	Gainbridge Fieldhouse; 16,284	2–9
12	June 18	Phoenix	L 75–83	Aneesah Morrow (16)	Olivia Nelson-Ododa (14)	Marina Mabrey (7)	Mohegan Sun Arena; 7,864	2–10
13	June 20	Dallas	L 83–86	Tina Charles (26)	Aneesah Morrow (7)	Marina Mabrey (6)	Mohegan Sun Arena; 8,910	2–11
14	June 22	@ Golden State	L 63–87	Aneesah Morrow (14)	Charles, Nelson-Ododa (6)	Hartley, Nelson-Ododa, Rivers (3)	Chase Center; 18,064	2–12
15	June 25	@ Las Vegas	L 59–85	Tina Charles (18)	Morrow, Peters (6)	Lindsay Allen (4)	Michelob Ultra Arena; 10,432	2–13
16	June 27	@ Seattle	L 81–97	Aneesah Morrow (20)	Aneesah Morrow (11)	Hartley, Rivers (6)	Climate Pledge Arena; 10,776	2–14
17	June 29	@ Minnesota	L 63–102	Aneesah Morrow (16)	Aneesah Morrow (11)	Allen, Peters (3)	Target Center; 8,821	2–15

July : 2–6 (Home: 2–4; Road: 0–2)

Game	Date	Team	Score	High points	High rebounds	High assists	Location Attendance	Record
18	July 6	Las Vegas	L 68–86	Aneesah Morrow (12)	Nelson-Ododa, Rivers (7)	Lindsay Allen (5)	Mohegan Sun Arena; 8,476	2–16
19	July 9	Seattle	W 93–83	Tina Charles (29)	Tina Charles (11)	Saniya Rivers (7)	Mohegan Sun Arena; 7,984	3–16
20	July 11	@ Seattle	L 65–79	Tina Charles (20)	Tina Charles (10)	Charles, Rivers (3)	Climate Pledge Arena; 9,569	3–17
21	July 13	@ Los Angeles	L 88–92	Bria Hartley (25)	Charles, Morrow (7)	Bria Hartley (6)	Crypto.com Arena; 12,184	3–18
22	July 15	Indiana	L 77–85	Tina Charles (21)	Aneesah Morrow (12)	Charles, Rivers, Sheldon (3)	TD Garden; 19,156	3–19
All-Star Game
23	July 24	Los Angeles	L 86–101	Tina Charles (24)	Tina Charles (10)	Leïla Lacan (6)	Mohegan Sun Arena; 7,375	3–20
24	July 27	Golden State	W 95–64	Tina Charles (24)	Aneesah Morrow (11)	Allen, Mabrey (4)	Mohegan Sun Arena; 8,294	4–20
25	July 28	Seattle	L 85–101	Bria Hartley (17)	Aneesah Morrow (7)	Hartley, Lacan (4)	Mohegan Sun Arena; 7,136	4–21

August : 6–8 (Home: 3–3; Road: 3–5)

Game	Date	Team	Score	High points	High rebounds	High assists	Location Attendance	Record
26	August 1	New York	W 78–62	Marina Mabrey (18)	Aneesah Morrow (11)	Marina Mabrey (8)	Mohegan Sun Arena; 8,664	5–21
27	August 3	New York	L 78–87	Tina Charles (17)	Aneesah Morrow (9)	Hartley, Rivers (4)	Mohegan Sun Arena; 8,747	5–22
28	August 5	@ Phoenix	L 66–82	Marina Mabrey (18)	Tina Charles (7)	Bria Hartley (4)	PHX Arena; 8,083	5–23
29	August 7	@ Los Angeles	L 91–102	Charles, Mabrey (19)	Charles, Mabrey, Morrow (7)	Leïla Lacan (7)	Crypto.com Arena; 10,780	5–24
30	August 10	@ Las Vegas	L 86–94	Marina Mabrey (22)	Tina Charles (5)	Leïla Lacan (5)	Michelob Ultra Arena; 10,407	5–25
31	August 11	@ Golden State	L 57–74	Aneesah Morrow (13)	Aneesah Morrow (14)	Hartley, Mabrey (4)	Chase Center; 18,604	5–26
32	August 13	Chicago	W 72–61	Leïla Lacan (17)	Aneesah Morrow (9)	Saniya Rivers (6)	Mohegan Sun Arena; 6,848	6–26
33	August 17	Indiana	L 93–99 (OT)	Marina Mabrey (27)	Aneesah Morrow (11)	Leïla Lacan (14)	Mohegan Sun Arena; 8,910	6–27
34	August 19	@ Washington	W 80–69	Saniya Rivers (17)	Charles, Nelson-Ododa (9)	Lacan, Nelson-Ododa (4)	CareFirst Arena; 4,200	7–27
35	August 21	Washington	W 67–56	Tina Charles (21)	Aneesh Morrow (8)	Lacan, Mabrey (5)	Mohegan Sun Arena; 7,144	8–27
36	August 23	@ Chicago	W 94–84	Charles, Hartley (23)	Tina Charles (10)	Marina Mabrey (8)	Wintrust Arena; 8,412	9–27
37	August 25	@ New York	L 79–81	Leïla Lacan (22)	Aneesah Morrow (15)	Marina Mabrey (5)	Barclays Center; 15,011	9–28
38	August 27	@ Dallas	W 101–95	Leïla Lacan (22)	Aneesah Morrow (11)	Hartley, Lacan (6)	College Park Center; 5,710	10–28
39	August 30	Minnesota	L 70–94	Charles, Mabrey (14)	Aneesah Morrow (11)	Leïla Lacan (5)	Mohegan Sun Arena; 8,910	10–29

September : 1–4 (Home: 1–2; Road: 0–2)

Game	Date	Team	Score	High points	High rebounds	High assists	Location Attendance	Record
40	September 1	Atlanta	L 76–93	Tina Charles (22)	Tina Charles (8)	Lindsay Allen (5)	Mohegan Sun Arena; 8,081	10–30
41	September 3	@ Chicago	L 64–88	Tina Charles (19)	Aaliyah Edwards (8)	Marina Mabrey (6)	Wintrust Arena; 7,195	10–31
42	September 6	Phoenix	W 87–84	Marina Mabrey (23)	Aneesah Morrow (13)	Saniya Rivers (5)	Mohegan Sun Arena; 8,910	11–31
43	September 8	@ Atlanta	L 62–87	Saniya Rivers (16)	Aneesah Morrow (14)	Marina Mabrey (6)	Gateway Center Arena; 3,319	11–32
44	September 10	Atlanta	L 72–88	Marina Mabrey (22)	Aneesah Morrow (10)	Mabrey, Rivers (5)	Mohegan Sun Arena; 7,508	11–33

2025 season schedule

Notes:

- Games highlighted in ██ represent Commissioner's Cup games.

== Standings ==
#	Team	W	L	PCT	GB	Conf.	Home	Road	Cup
1	yx – Minnesota Lynx	34	10	.773	–	20–4	20–2	14–8	5–1
2	x – Las Vegas Aces	30	14	.682	4	16–8	17–5	13–9	2–4
3	x – Atlanta Dream	30	14	.682	4	15–6	16–6	14–8	3–2
4	x – Phoenix Mercury	27	17	.614	7	13–11	15–7	12–10	4–2
5	x – New York Liberty	27	17	.614	7	15–5	17–5	10–12	4–1
6	cx – Indiana Fever	24	20	.545	10	13–8	13–9	11–11	4–1
7	x – Seattle Storm	23	21	.523	11	12–12	10–12	13–9	4–2
8	x – Golden State Valkyries	23	21	.523	11	9–15	14–8	9–13	3–3
9	e – Los Angeles Sparks	21	23	.477	13	10–14	9–13	12–10	2–4
10	e – Washington Mystics	16	28	.364	18	8–12	10–12	6–16	2–3
11	e – Connecticut Sun	11	33	.250	23	7–14	7–15	4–18	1–4
12	e – Chicago Sky	10	34	.227	24	4–17	6–16	4–18	1–4
13	e – Dallas Wings	10	34	.227	24	4–20	6–16	4–18	1–5

Notes

(#) – League Standing
c – Commissioner's Cup winners
y – Regular Season Champion
x – Clinched playoff berth
e – Eliminated from playoff contention
Source: Overall standings and Commissioner's Cup Standings

== Statistics ==
Legend
GP	Games played	GS	Games started	MPG	Minutes per game	RPG	Rebounds per game
APG	Assists per game	SPG	Steals per game	BPG	Blocks per game	PPG	Points per game
FG%	Field-goal percentage	3P%	3-point field-goal percentage	FT%	Free-throw percentage	TO	Turnovers per game
PF	Fouls per game		Team leader		League leader

=== Regular season ===
Player	GP	GS	MPG	FG%	3P%	FT%	RPG	APG	SPG	BPG	TO	PPG
Marina Mabrey	35	34	31.5	36.7%	27.0%	87.0%	4.2	4.0	0.7	0.3	2.8	14.4
Tina Charles	43	42	28.4	43.8%	26.1%	85.7%	5.8	1.7	0.8	0.4	1.9	16.3
Leïla Lacan	25	15	26.6	47.7%	22.4%	85.7%	2.4	3.7	2.2	0.2	1.9	10.4
Saniya Rivers	42	25	26.1	40.7%	34.1%	74.6%	2.8	2.7	1.5	0.9	1.5	8.8
Jacy Sheldon	28	17	24.1	47.0%	41.2%	90.0%	1.9	2.0	1.0	0.2	1.1	7.5
Bria Hartley	38	32	22.8	36.2%	36.7%	77.2%	2.0	3.1	0.8	0.0	1.8	8.9
Olivia Nelson-Ododa	37	21	21.6	52.6%	50.0%	70.3%	5.0	0.9	0.7	1.2	1.1	8.2
Aneesah Morrow	41	23	18.9	37.5%	24.0%	75.8%	6.9	0.5	0.8	0.4	1.1	7.7
Aaliyah Edwards	15	0	17.0	40.0%	0.0%	67.7%	4.2	0.7	0.9	0.5	1.2	4.6
Lindsay Allen	31	9	14.5	40.0%	16.7%	82.6%	1.0	2.0	0.3	0.2	1.0	2.4
Jaelyn Brown	10	0	13.1	37.8%	44.4%	50.0%	1.2	0.1	0.5	0.2	0.5	3.7
Haley Peters	33	2	11.5	30.5%	20.5%	76.9%	2.2	0.8	0.3	0.1	0.7	2.1
Robyn Parks	6	0	10.5	20.0%	0.0%	—	1.5	0.3	0.3	—	0.2	0.3
Mamignan Touré	18	0	8.2	35.9%	36.4%	—	0.4	0.5	0.4	—	0.4	2.0
Kariata Diaby	13	0	7.9	50.0%	—	78.6%	1.0	0.4	0.5	0.1	0.9	1.9
Rayah Marshall	15	0	6.0	34.6%	0.0%	58.3%	1.7	0.3	0.1	0.2	0.5	1.7

== Awards and honors ==
Recipient	Award	Date awarded	Ref.
Tina Charles	Eastern Conference Player of the Week	August 26	
Leïla Lacan	AP All-Rookie Team	September 12	
