= Rayah Marshall =

American basketball player (born 2003)

No. 13 – PAOK
- Position: Forward-center
- League: WNBA

Personal information
- Born: November 15, 2003 (age 23) Los Angeles, California, U.S.
- Listed height: 6 ft 4 in (1.93 m)

Career information
- High school: Lynwood (Los Angeles, California)
- College: USC (2021–2025)
- WNBA draft: 2025: 2nd round, 25th overall pick
- Drafted by: Connecticut Sun
- Playing career: 2025–present

Career history
- 2025: Connecticut Sun
- 2026: Dallas Wings
- 2026: Connecticut Sun

Career highlights
- Big Ten All-Defensive Team (2025); All Pac-12 First Team (2023); Pac-12 All-Defensive Team (2023); Pac-12 All-Freshman Team (2022); McDonald's All-American (2021); Jordan Brand Classic (2021)
- Stats at Basketball Reference
Medals
Women's basketball
Representing the United States
FIBA AmeriCup
Silver medal – second place	2023 Mexico	Team

Rayah Marshall (born November 15, 2003) is an American professional basketball player for the Connecticut Sun of the Women's National Basketball Association (WNBA). She previously played for the Dallas Wings. She played college basketball at USC.

== High school career ==
Marshall attended Lynwood High School in Los Angeles, California, where she was a four-time LA Times First Team honoree. During her junior year, she averaged 18.1 points, 10.5 rebounds, 2.6 blocks and 2.4 steals per game. During her senior year, she averaged 23.7 points, 12.8 rebounds, 2.8 assists, 2.3 steals and 2.8 blocks per game, and led Lynwood to the 2021 CIF Division 1-AA championship. She committed to play college basketball at USC.

== College career ==
During the 2021–22 season, in her freshman year, she appeared in 28 games, with four starts, and averaged 11.2 points, 7.7 rebounds, 1.1 assists, 1.3 steals, and 2.54 blocks per game. She ranked first on the team in rebounding, and third in scoring, while she led all freshmen in the nation in blocks. On December 18, 2021, in game against Texas Southern, she scored 14 points and a then career-high 17 rebounds for her first career double-double. Following the season she was named to the Pac-12 all-freshman team.

During the 2022–23 season, in her sophomore year, she started 28 games and averaged 12.7 points, 11.5 rebounds, 1.4 assists, 1.5 steals, and 3.5 blocks per game. She became the first Trojan player to average a double-double in a season since Tina Thompson during the 1996–97 season. On December 30, 2022, in a game against Oregon State, she scored a career-high 33 points. On February 3, 2023, in a game against Arizona State, she recorded a career-high 21 rebounds. On March 17, 2023, during the first round of the 2023 NCAA tournament against South Dakota State, she recorded seven blocks to set the single-season program record. She finished the season with 98 blocks, surpassing the previous record of 95 set by Lisa Leslie during the 1992–93 season. Following the season she was named to the All Pac-12 First Team and Pac-12 All Defensive team. She was also named a semifinalist for the Naismith Defensive Player of the Year award.

During the 2023–24 season, in her junior year, she started 33 games and averaged 10.2 points, 10.5 rebounds, 1.5 assists, 1.2 steals and 2.0 blocks per games. Following the season she was named an All-Pac-12 honorable mention, and Pac-12 All-Defensive team honorable mention. During the 2024–25 season, in her senior year, she started 33 games and averaged 7.9 points, 8.4 rebounds, 2.4 assists and 1.2 steals and 2.1 blocks per games. On March 31, 2025, during the Elite 8 of the 2025 NCAA tournament against UConn, she scored a team-high 23 points and 15 rebounds, for her 40th career double-double, and was named to the regional all-tournament team. Following the season she was named an All-Big Ten honorable mention, and Big Ten All-Defensive team honoree. She was also named a top-ten finalist for the Lisa Leslie Award.

She finished her career with 1,265 points, 1,161 rebounds, 197 assists, 156 steals and 306 blocks. She became the eighth player in program history to surpass 1,000 career points and 1,000 career rebounds. Her 306 blocks are the third-most in program history, trailing only Lisa Leslie (321) and Cheryl Miller (320).

== Professional career ==
On April 14, 2025, Marshall was drafted in the second round, 25th overall, by the Connecticut Sun in the 2025 WNBA draft. During the 2025 WNBA season she averaged averaged 1.7 points and 1.7 rebounds in 15 games for the Sun.

On April 9, 2026, Marshall was traded to the Dallas Wings in exchange for Diamond Miller. She was waived by the Wings on May 4, 2026.

On August 1, 2026, Marshall signed a seven-day hardship contract with the Connecticut Sun. On August 9, she signed a second seven-day hardship contract with the team.

== National team career ==
On May 14, 2023, Marshall was selected to represent the United States at the 2023 FIBA Women's AmeriCup. During the tournament she averaged 2.7 points, 5.2 rebounds and 0.8 assists per game and won a silver medal.

== Career statistics ==
Legend
GP	Games played	GS	Games started	MPG	Minutes per game	RPG	Rebounds per game
APG	Assists per game	SPG	Steals per game	BPG	Blocks per game	PPG	Points per game
TO	Turnovers per game	FG%	Field-goal percentage	3P%	3-point field-goal percentage	FT%	Free-throw percentage
**Bold**	Career best	°	League leader

=== WNBA ===
==== Regular season ====
Stats current through end of 2025 season

WNBA regular season statistics
Year	Team	GP	GS	MPG	FG%	3P%	FT%	RPG	APG	SPG	BPG	TO	PPG
2025	Connecticut	15	0	6.0	.346	.000	.583	1.7	0.3	0.1	0.2	0.5	1.7
**Career**	1 year, 1 team	15	0	6.0	.346	.000	.583	1.7	0.3	0.1	0.2	0.5	1.7

=== College ===
NCAA statistics
Year	Team	GP	GS	MPG	FG%	3P%	FT%	RPG	APG	SPG	BPG	TO	PPG
2021–22	USC	28	4	24.2	39.5	20.0	73.8	7.7	1.1	1.3	2.5	1.7	11.2
2022–23	USC	28	28	**30.9**	38.1	18.2	62.2	**11.5**	1.4	**1.5**	**3.5**	1.8	**12.7**
2023–24	USC	32	32	28.4	47.2	0.0	68.5	10.5	1.5	1.2	2.0	**1.2**	10.2
2024–25	USC	**33**	**33**	24.5	**48.0**	**50.0**	**75.4**	8.4	**2.4**	1.2	2.1	1.6	7.9
**Career**		121	97	26.9	42.5	22.9	68.7	9.5	1.6	1.3	2.5	1.6	10.4

== Personal life ==
Marshall was born to Latonya Marshall-Jackson and Jimmy Marshall, and has three siblings, Lee Jackson, Jimmaine Marshall and Brian Johnson.
