= Cavigal Nice Basket =

Cavigal Nice Basket 06
- Founded: 1943
- History: Cavigal Nice (1943–1955); Cavigal Nice Sports Basket (1955–2007); Cavigal Nice Basket 06 (2007–present)
- Arena: Salle Leyrit (1,700 seats)
- Location: Nice, Alpes Maritimes, France
- Team colors: Black
- Website: cnb06.com/accueil/

Cavigal Nice Basket is a French professional basketball team located in the city of Nice. The club was founded in 1943 from the combination of three clubs, AS CAsino, VIctorine and GALia Club.
