= 2027 WNBA season =

- League: Women's National Basketball Association
- Sport: Basketball
- Duration: May – October 2027
- Teams: 15
- TV partner(s): ABC/ESPN; NBC/NBCSN; USA Network/CNBC (Simulcast); Ion; CBS; NBA TV
- Streaming partner(s): ESPN DTC; Prime Video; Peacock; Paramount+

Draft
- Picked by: Toronto Tempo

Regular season

Playoffs

WNBA seasons
- ← 2026 2028 →

The 2027 WNBA Season will be the 31st season of Women's National Basketball Association (WNBA).

On August 18, 2026, the WNBA announced that the Golden State Valkyries would host the 2027 WNBA All-Star Game and related events. The All-Star game will be played at the Chase Center on Saturday, July 31, while the three-point contest and Skills Challenge took place on Friday, July 30, at the same arena.

== Drafts ==
=== Draft lottery ===
On October 28, 2026, the WNBA announced that the 2027 draft lottery would be broadcast on Sunday, November 15, on ESPN.

The Toronto Tempo won the first overall pick in the draft lottery.

=== 2027 WNBA draft ===
The 2027 WNBA draft will be held on Monday, April 12, 2027.

== Media coverage ==
=== United States ===
This will be the second season of the 11-year media rights agreements with the ESPN family of networks, NBC Sports, and Amazon Prime Video.

Due to NBC's deal being signed in 2024 before NBCUniversal spun off most of its domestic cable networks to Versant in January 2026, the league signed a separate 11-year agreement for expanded coverage on USA Network.

This will be the second season of new multi-year deals with CBS Sports and Scripps Sports.

=== Local ===
- The Houston Comets have just announced a new agreement with Tegna Inc. to broadcast games locally on KHOU and KTBU and simulcast on Space City Home Network beginning this season.
