= Napheesa Collier =

American basketball player (born 1996)

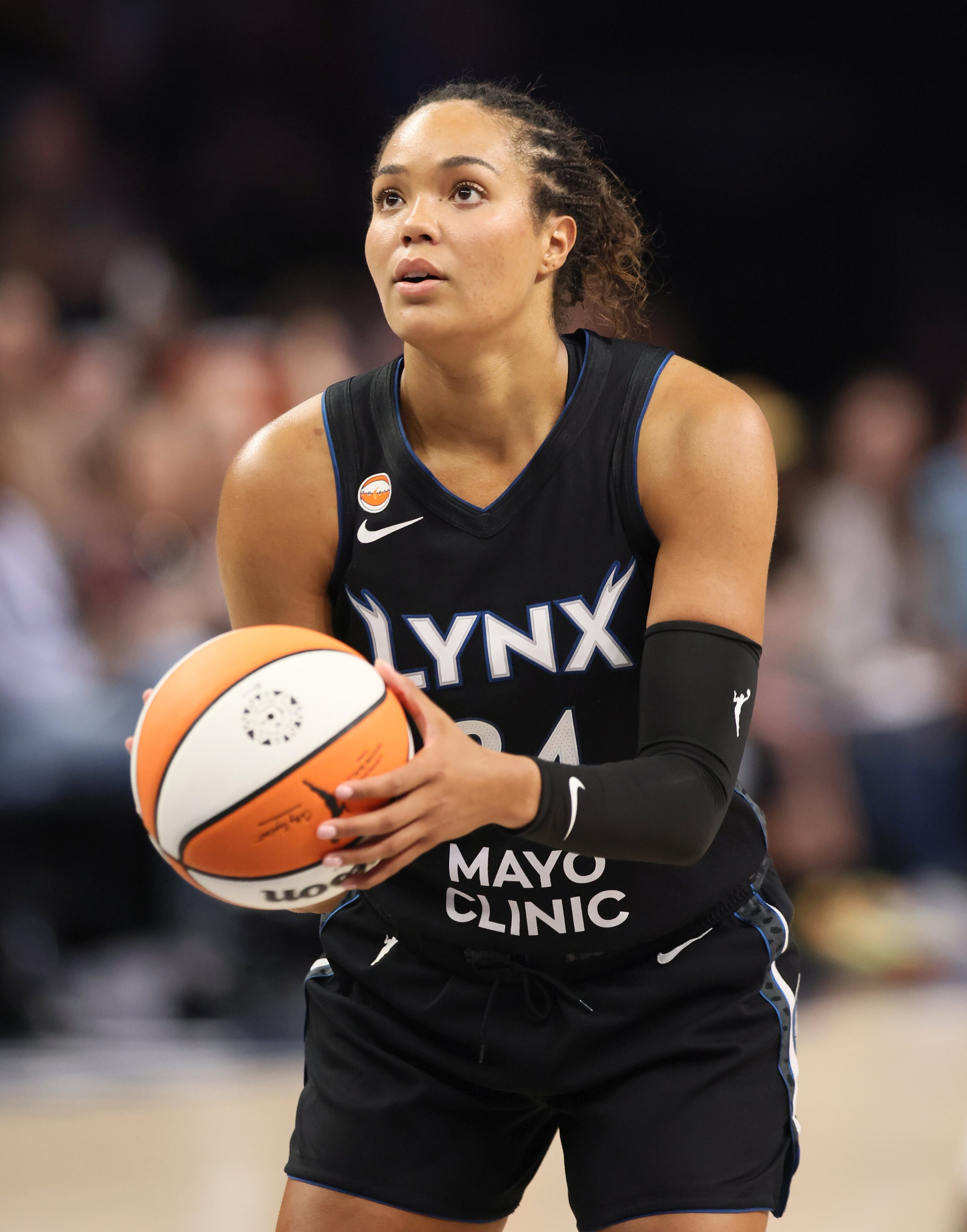
- Collier with the Minnesota Lynx in 2026

No. 24 – Minnesota Lynx
- Position: Power forward / small forward
- League: WNBA

Personal information
- Born: September 23, 1996 (age 30) Jefferson City, Missouri, U.S.
- Listed height: 6 ft 1 in (1.85 m)
- Listed weight: 182 lb (83 kg)

Career information
- High school: Jefferson City (Jefferson City, Missouri); Incarnate Word Academy (Bel-Nor, Missouri)
- College: UConn (2015–2019)
- WNBA draft: 2019: 1st round, 6th overall pick
- Drafted by: Minnesota Lynx
- Playing career: 2019–present

Career history
- 2019–present: Minnesota Lynx
- 2020–2021: Lattes-Montpellier
- 2023–2024: Fenerbahçe
- 2025–present: Lunar Owls BC

Career highlights
- WNBA: 5× WNBA All-Star (2019, 2021, 2023–2025); WNBA All-Star Game MVP (2025); 3× All-WNBA First Team (2023–2025); All-WNBA Second Team (2020); WNBA Defensive Player of the Year (2024); 2× WNBA All-Defensive First Team (2024, 2025); 2× WNBA All-Defensive Second Team (2020, 2023); WNBA Rookie of the Year (2019); WNBA All-Rookie Team (2019); WNBA Commissioner's Cup champion (2024); WNBA Commissioner's Cup MVP (2024); 50–40–90 club (2025); Pro Basketball: Unrivaled MVP (2025); Unrivaled First-team all-Unrivaled (2025); EuroLeague champion (2024); FIBA Europe SuperCup Women champion (2023); FIBA Europe SuperCup Women MVP (2023); Turkish Super League champion (2024); NCAA: NCAA champion (2016); Katrina McClain Award (2019); 2× First-team All-American – AP (2017, 2019); First-team All-American – USBWA (2019); Third-team All-American – AP (2018); 2× WBCA Coaches' All-American (2017, 2019); All-American – USBWA (2017); 2× AAC Player of the Year (2017, 2019); AAC Defensive Player of the Year (2019); AAC Tournament MVP (2019); 3× First-team All-AAC (2017–2019); AAC All-Freshman Team (2016); High school: Co-Miss Show-Me Basketball (2015); McDonald's All-American (2015)
- Stats at WNBA.com
- Stats at Basketball Reference
Medals
Women's basketball
Representing the United States
Olympic Games
Gold medal – first place	2020 Tokyo	Team
Gold medal – first place	2024 Paris	Team
FIBA World Cup
Gold medal – first place	2026 Germany
FIBA AmeriCup
Gold medal – first place	2019 Puerto Rico	Team
FIBA Under-19 World Cup
Gold medal – first place	2015 Russia	Team
FIBA Under-18 Americas Championship
Gold medal – first place	2014 United States	Team
Women's 3x3 basketball
Representing the United States
Youth Olympic Games
Gold medal – first place	2014 China	Team

Napheesa Collier (/nəˈfiːsə ˈkɒljər/ nə-FEE-sə KOL-yər; born September 23, 1996), nicknamed "Phee", is an American professional basketball player for the Minnesota Lynx of the Women's National Basketball Association (WNBA) and for the Lunar Owls of Unrivaled. Collier is also a founder of the Unrivaled basketball league along with Breanna Stewart. After playing college basketball for the UConn Huskies, Collier was drafted by the Lynx with the 6th overall pick in the 2019 WNBA draft. She has won two Olympic gold medals playing on the United States women's national basketball team in the Tokyo 2020 and the Paris 2024 games. She currently serves as First Vice President of the Women's National Basketball Players Association.

== Early life ==
When Collier wanted to play basketball, the only Amateur Athletic Union (AAU) team in Jefferson City would not let her try out because they were told the team was full, so her parents started a new team, the Lady Warriors, and recruited girls from other nearby towns. The Lady Warriors went on to compete in the national AAU tournament. The team that originally denied Collier a chance to try out later offered her a spot, but she remained with the Lady Warriors.

Collier met fellow basketball player Maya Moore, who is also from Jefferson City, Missouri, and watched Moore play at the University of Connecticut and later for the Minnesota Lynx. After the Lynx retired Moore's jersey on August 24, 2024, Cheryl Reeve said, "The impact of Maya Moore is that Napheesa Collier got to dream of one day being like Maya Moore."

In her freshman year, Collier played for Jefferson City High School in Jefferson City, Missouri, where she averaged 17.9 points and 9.8 rebounds. In her sophomore year, she transferred to Incarnate Word Academy, where she averaged a high of 24.6 points and 12 rebounds. Her family moved to St. Louis after her mother's job in hospital administration called for a transfer to the larger city. Collier also competed on her high school track team. She was the 2013 and 2015 Gatorade Missouri Player of the Year, one of five finalists for the 2015 Naismith Award as national Player of the Year and Women's Basketball Coaches Association High School All-American.

== College career ==
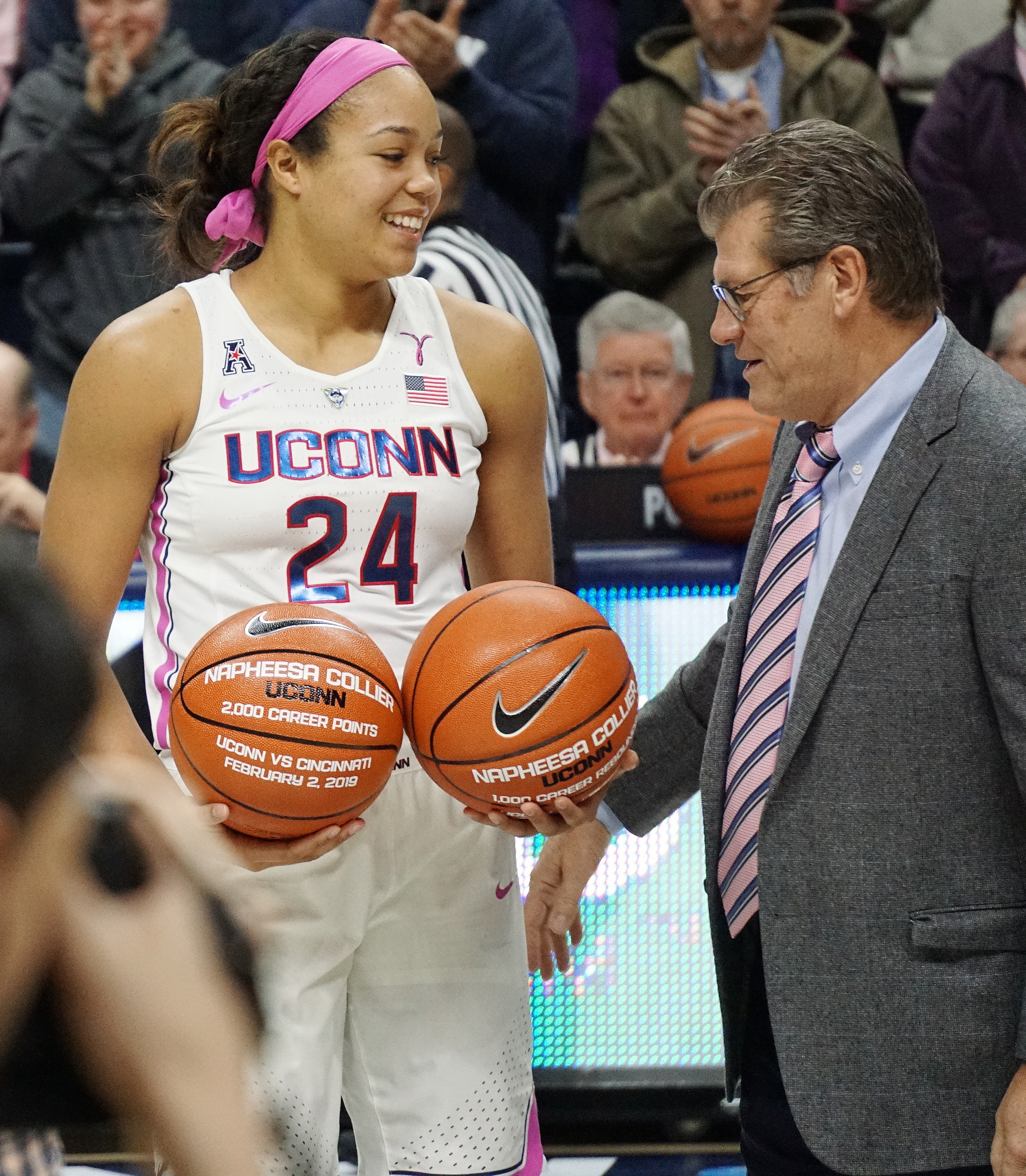
Napheesa Collier, being presented by UConn head coach Geno Auriemma with awards reflecting 2000 points and 1000 rebounds

Collier received scholarship offers from colleges around the country, but rather than playing for the school that had just won three straight championships (UConn), she was determined to play for a team that could beat them instead. Out of curiosity, Collier visited UConn's campus anyway, and after witnessing the camaraderie among players, she chose to join the UConn team for her freshman year in 2015.

At the end of her time at UConn, Collier ranked 3rd all-time in career scoring, 4th in rebounds, and 7th in blocks. She ranks 4th in most consecutive starts at UConn, with 112, had 49 career double-doubles, and averaged a double-double (20.8/10.8) her senior season. She became the fifth player in the exclusive 2000/1000 club, joining UConn greats Maya Moore, Tina Charles, Breanna Stewart and Rebecca Lobo. Collier reached the 1000 rebound mark in the game against Louisville, and reached 2000 points in the very next game against Cincinnati. She was a member of the 2016 Connecticut Huskies National Champion team and reached the Final Four in each of her four years at UConn. She received the Katrina McClain Award for Power Forward of the Year from the Naismith Memorial Basketball Hall of Fame in her senior season. She was an AP 1st Team All-American in both her senior and sophomore seasons, and 2nd Team in her junior season. Collier has the most rebounds (411) in a season at UConn, and finished 2nd with most points in a season at 792 points, trailing only Maya Moore. As a duo, Collier and Katie Lou Samuelson scored the most points in UConn WBB history (4688), topping B. Stewart and M. Jefferson, two teammates from their freshman season.

== Professional career ==
=== Minnesota Lynx (2019–present) ===
==== 2019 season: Rookie of the Year, All-Rookie Team, first All-Star appearance ====
Collier was selected by the Minnesota Lynx as the 6th overall pick in the 2019 WNBA draft. She was asked to play small forward, then power forward, and later, small forward. In her first WNBA game, Collier scored 27 points against the Chicago Sky, the second-highest debut ever for any rookie (after Candace Parker). She played 33.3 minutes per game, the highest among all WNBA players.

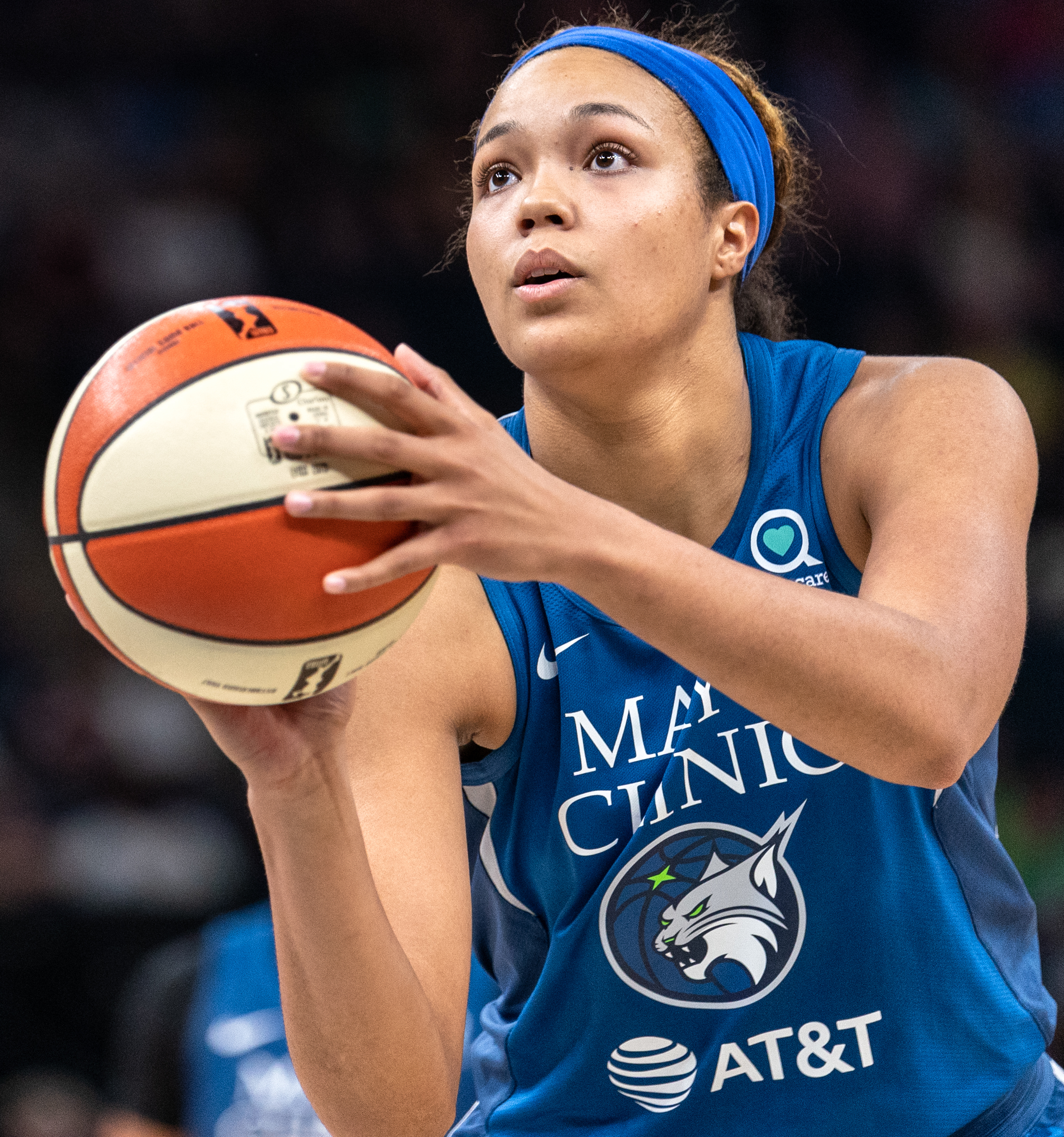
Collier in 2019

She is the second rookie (after Tamika Catchings) in WNBA history to record 400 points, 200 rebounds and 60 steals. Collier is the fourth player (after Maya Moore, Catchings, and Sheryl Swoopes) to have a season with 400 points, 200 rebounds, 75 assists, 50 steals, 25 blocks and 25 made three-pointers. Collier was voted to the 2019 WNBA All-Rookie Team, and made an All-Star as an injury replacement for A'ja Wilson.

For the season, Collier averaged 13.3 points, 6.6 rebounds, 2.6 assists, 1.9 steals and 0.9 blocks. She shot 49.0% from the field, 36.1% from three, and 79.2% from the free throw line. She was chosen ESPNW, Associated Press, and WNBA Rookie of the Year.

==== 2020 season: In the bubble ====
In the 2020 season while in the WNBA bubble, Collier started a podcast with A'ja Wilson, Tea with A & Phee, which was picked up by Just Women's Sports the next year. She was selected for the All-WNBA Second Team and the All-Defensive Second Team for the first time.

==== 2021 season: All-Star again ====
Collier was selected for her second All-Star game.

==== 2022 season: Maternity leave, send off for Sylvia Fowles ====
Collier was on maternity leave for most of the 2022 season due to the birth of her daughter in May 2022. She returned to the Lynx in August 2022 and played four games. She stated she wanted to be able to return to play once more with Sylvia Fowles, who retired from the Lynx and the WNBA after the 2022 season.

==== 2023 season: All-WNBA First Team, playoff return ====
Collier returned in 2023 stronger and had an MVP-caliber season for the Lynx in her first as the team's new captain. At the June 29, 2023, game, Collier became only the second player in WNBA history to put up a stat line with 30+ points/5+ rebounds/5+ assists/5+ blocks; Collier had 31 points, eight rebounds, five assists and six blocks. She returned to the All-Star game for her third appearance. She was selected for the All-WNBA First Team for the first time. She was also selected for the WNBA All-Defensive Second Team for the second time. She was also named to the Minnesota Lynx All-25 Team for the team's 25th anniversary.

==== 2024 season: MVP caliber play, Defensive Player of the Year ====
Beginning the 2024 season, Collier became the first player in the league to ever "score at least 115 points, get 50 rebounds and have 25 or more steals and blocks (she has 14 steals and 11 blocks) and 20 assists in any five-game stretch," as reported by Cheryl Reeve on May 27, 2024. She was named the Western Conference Player of the Week for the fifth time on May 21, 2024, averaging "24.5 points on 46.3% shooting, 10.5 rebounds, 2.5 assists, 3.5 steals and 2.0 blocks per game." In the June 14, 2024, Lynx home game against the Sparks, Collier became the first WNBA player to ever have 30+ points, 8+ steals, 5+ rebounds, and 2+ blocks in a game. Her eight steals in the game set a new Lynx franchise record. Collier won the MVP award when the Lynx won the 2024 WNBA Commissioner's Cup championship on June 25, 2024, against the New York Liberty.

After the Olympic break, Collier continued her MVP-level play. In the August 23, 2024, game against the Las Vegas Aces, Collier out rebounded the entire Aces team with 18 rebounds (Aces had 17). She became only the third WNBA player to ever individually outrebound the entire opposing team. Collier's performance in that game against the Aces also created league history with her becoming the first WNBA player to ever have 25+ points, 15+ rebounds, and 5+ assists on 70%+ shooting; Collier had 27 points, 18 rebounds, 5 assists, and shot 73.3%.

Collier was named by the WNBA as the Western Conference Player of the Week for August 15–25. This is her second such honor in the 2024 season and the sixth time she has been selected for this honor in her career. She was later named the Western Conference Player of the Month for August 2024, which was the first time Collier received this award. For the third time in the season, Collier was named the WNBA Western Conference Player of the Week for September 2–8.

After the conclusion of the regular season, she was selected by the Associated Press as the Defensive Player of the Year and was named to the Associated Press WNBA First Team. She was one of two players (along with A'ja Wilson) to be selected unanimously. On September 29, 2024, before the Lynx began their semifinals series against the Connecticut Sun, Collier was named the WNBA Defensive Player of the Year and also named to the WNBA All-Defensive First Team. Collier was the runner up for the WNBA MVP award with 66 out of 67 votes for second place in the shadow of A'ja Wilson's historic season. When Maya Moore was in Minnesota for her jersey retirement in August 2024, she said of Collier, "I can tell that she's hitting her prime, and the sky's the limit for her."

===== 2024 Playoffs =====
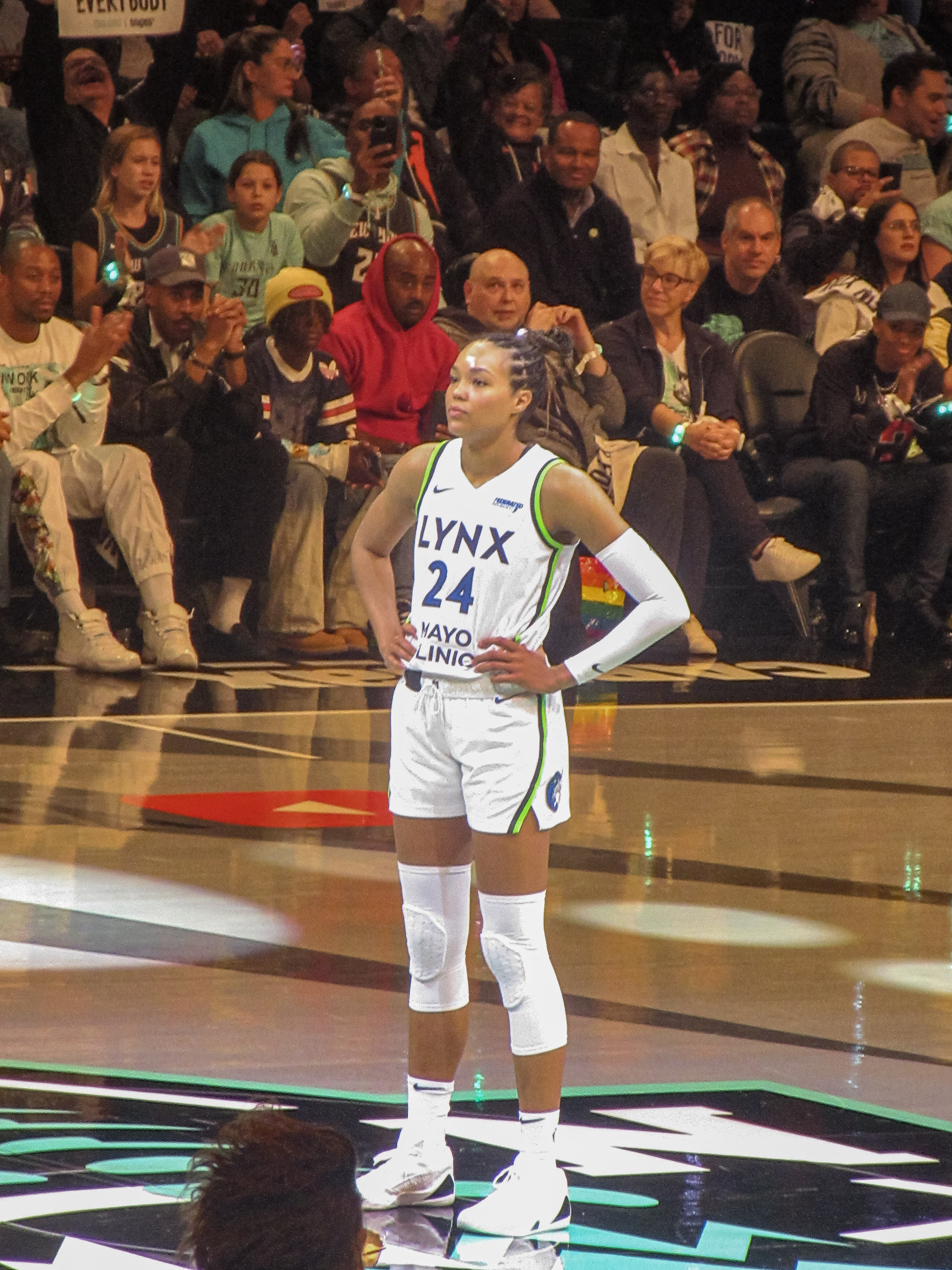
Collier right before tip-off of Game 1 of the 2024 WNBA Finals. The Lynx won in Collier's WNBA Finals debut, but eventually lost the series to the Liberty 2–3.

In the first round of the 2024 WNBA playoffs against the Phoenix Mercury on September 22, 2024, in Minnesota, Collier became the second player in Lynx franchise history (after Maya Moore) to have multiple 30+ point games in the postseason. She made 38 points in that game. In the second game against the Mercury on September 25, 2024, Collier scored 42 points, tying the WNBA playoffs single game point total record set by Breanna Stewart and Angel McCoughtry. In this game, she set a WNBA record for the most points through the first two games of a playoff series (her total is 80 points). She was also the first WNBA player to score 35+ points in consecutive postseason games. In the semifinals game 5 on October 8, 2024, against the Connecticut Sun, Collier became the first WNBA player to have 25+ points and 10+ rebounds in three straight playoff games.

====== Finals ======
In Game 1 of the finals against the New York Liberty, Collier became the first WNBA player to get 20+ points, 8+ rebounds, 6+ blocks, and 3+ steals in a playoff game. In Game 3, she set a new record for the most points in a single postseason with 249 points, breaking Diana Taurasi's 15-year record. Collier achieved her record in 10 games, while it took Taurasi 11 games to set hers. By the end of the finals, Collier became the first player in the league to lead a single playoff run in points (285), rebounds (107), steals (25), and blocks (23). She also broke Tamika Catchings' 2009 record and now holds the record for the most steals and blocks in postseason play with a total of 48.

==== 2025 season ====
On May 28, 2025, Collier was named the Western Conference Player of the Week for the league. The award noted she "opened the season averaging 29.5 points, 7.3 rebounds, 2.5 assists, 1.8 steals and 1.3 blocks in 35.0 minutes per game, helping Minnesota to its best start since 2017." Collier missed the May 30, 2025, game against the Phoenix Mercury because of a sore knee.

On June 29, Collier was named as an All-Star and announced as team captain for the 2025 WNBA All-Star Game, her first captaincy in her WNBA career.

She was named the Western Conference Player of the Month for May, June, and July.

At the conclusion of the 2025 season she had become the second WNBA player to join the 50-40-90 club after Elena Delle Donne had done so in 2019 as Collier ended the season with shooting percentages of 53% from the field, 40% from three, and 91% from the free throw line.

The New York Times (The Athletic) named Collier as one of the 20 most admired leaders in sports from 2025, quoting UConn's Andrea Hudy on Collier's efficiency, excellence and professionalism: "She shows up, treats people well and competes with a quiet ruthlessness that makes her impact unmistakable".

==== 2026 season ====
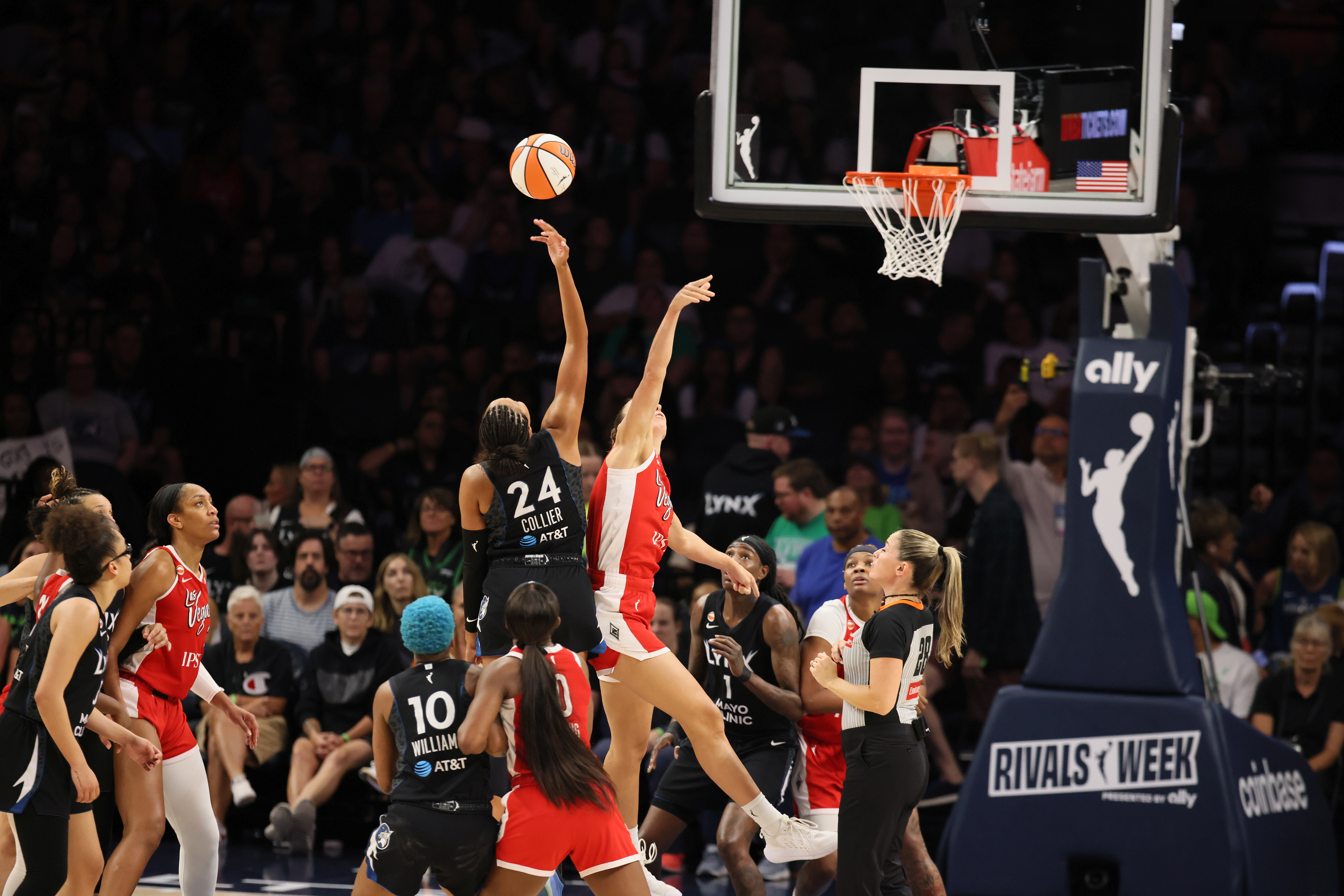
Collier winning a jump ball against the Las Vegas Aces in August 2026.

In April 2026, Collier re-signed with the Minnesota Lynx. After being out for recovery from surgery on both of her ankles, she returned to the court in the July 22, 2026, game against the Seattle Storm, scoring 24 points and 10 rebounds. Collier is one of three WNBA players featured in the ESPN documentary series Life in the W released over All-Star weekend and filmed during the 2025 season.

=== Overseas ===
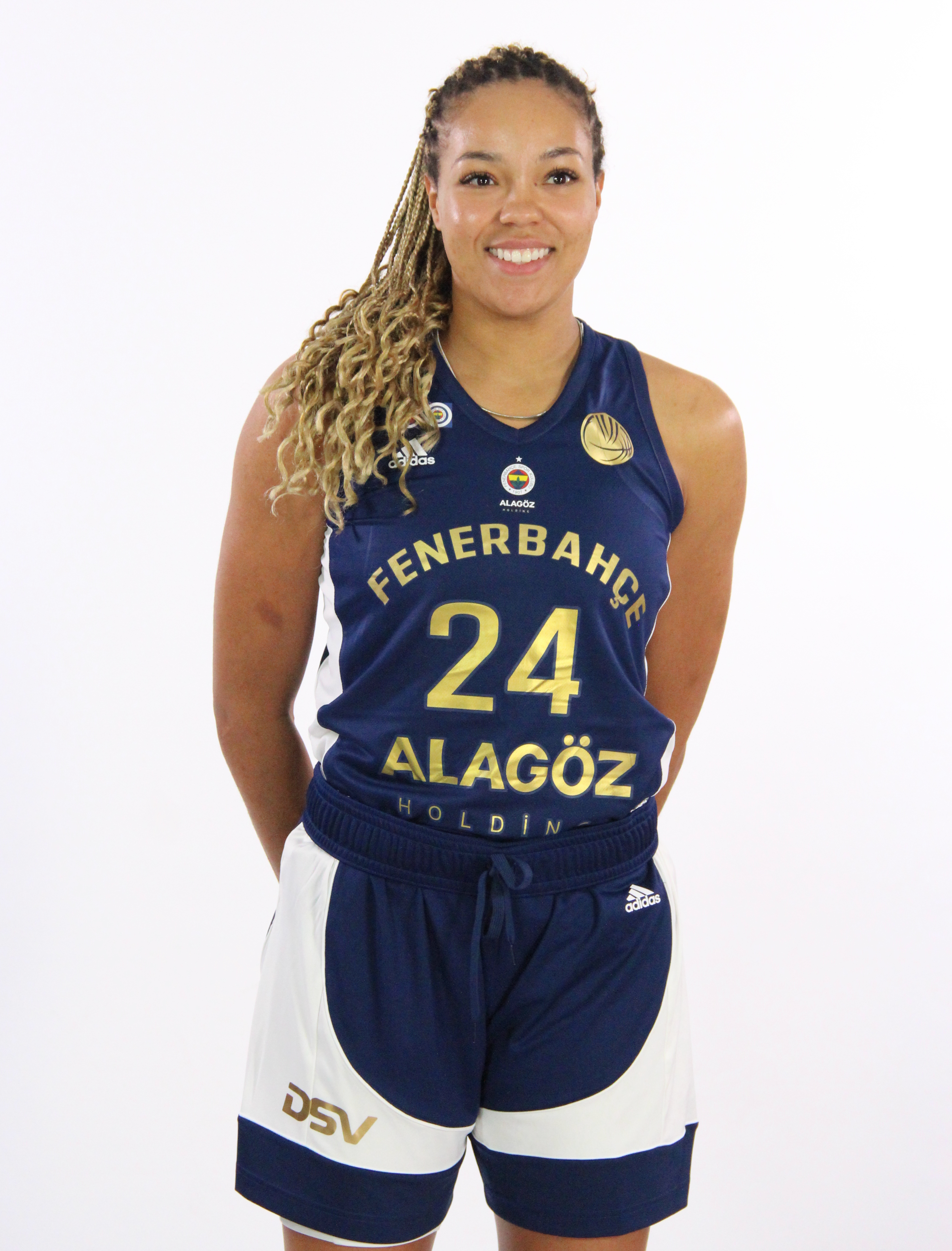
Collier with Fenerbahçe in October 2023, prior to winning the 2024 EuroLeague championship.

Collier played for Lattes-Montpellier in France in 2021, where she was part of the team that won the Coupe De France Finale in Paris.

In 2023, Collier played for Fenerbahçe in the Turkish Super League on a short-term contract, along with her Lynx teammate, Kayla McBride. During her short time with the team, she was named Most Valuable Player in the SuperCup Women championship. She returned to the team in January 2024. She was part of the team that won the club's second straight EuroLeague Women championship in April 2024. Collier had 33 points in the final, which was the second highest ever.

=== Unrivaled ===
In July 2023, Collier announced she and Breanna Stewart were forming a new professional women's league, Unrivaled, to give WNBA players an option to play in the W's off season and have an alternative to playing overseas to earn money. The league started in 2025 and features 36 players in a 3-on-3 and 1-on-1 format. The initial season is from January through March and is played in Miami. On July 10, 2024, Collier was formally announced to appear and play in the inaugural season of Unrivaled. She plays for Lunar Owls.

On February 14, 2025, Collier won the Unrivaled 1x1 tournament and the $200,000 prize. Her win also meant each of her Lunar Owls teammates got $10,000.

Collier was named MVP for the 2025 season.

Collier missed the 2026 season for Unrivaled due to ankle surgery.

== National team career ==
In June 2021, Collier was named to the United States women's Olympic basketball team to compete in the 2020 Summer Olympics, marking her first selection to an Olympic roster. She and Team USA went on to win the gold medal in the tournament, defeating Japan 90–75 in the final.

Collier was again named to the women's Olympic roster to compete at the 2024 Summer Olympics. Collier and the United States defeated France 67–66 in the final, earning Collier her second consecutive gold medal and the United States' eighth consecutive gold medal.

== Career statistics ==
Legend
GP	Games played	GS	Games started	MPG	Minutes per game	RPG	Rebounds per game
APG	Assists per game	SPG	Steals per game	BPG	Blocks per game	PPG	Points per game
TO	Turnovers per game	FG%	Field-goal percentage	3P%	3-point field-goal percentage	FT%	Free-throw percentage
**Bold**	Career best	°	League leader

*	Denotes seasons in which Collier won an NCAA championship

=== WNBA ===
==== Regular season ====
WNBA regular season statistics
Year	Team	GP	GS	MPG	FG%	3P%	FT%	RPG	APG	SPG	BPG	TO	PPG
2019	Minnesota	34	34	33.3	.490	.361	.792	6.6	2.6	**1.9**	.9	1.9	13.1
2020	Minnesota	22	22	34.2	.523	.408	.829	9.0	3.3	1.8	1.3	2.7	16.1
2021	Minnesota	29	29	34.6	.441	.253	.860	6.6	3.2	1.3	1.3	2.3	16.2
2022	Minnesota	4	4	22.8	.423	.286	.714	3.0	1.0	.5	.3	**.3**	7.3
2023	Minnesota	**37**	**37**	33.5	.485	.298	.840	8.5	2.5	1.6	1.2	2.4	21.5
2024	Minnesota	34	34	**34.7**	.492	.310	.804	**9.7**	**3.4**	**1.9**	1.4	2.1	20.4
2025	Minnesota	33	33	32.3	**.531**	.403	**.906**	7.3	3.2	1.6	**1.5**	2.1	**22.9**
2026	Minnesota	16	16	29.3	.500	**.444**	.857	6.9	2.6	1.3	.9	2.2	16.8
**Career**	8 years, 1 team	209	209	33.2	.493	.345	.842	7.8	2.9	1.7	1.2	2.2	18.2
**Career**	All-Star	5	1	11.0	.600	.400	1.000	4.4	.8	.4	.4	.2	12.4

==== Playoffs ====
WNBA playoff statistics
Year	Team	GP	GS	MPG	FG%	3P%	FT%	RPG	APG	SPG	BPG	TO	PPG
2019	Minnesota	1	1	38.0°	**.727**	.333	.500	**10.0**	3.0	2.0	1.0	4.0	19.0
2020	Minnesota	4	4	34.3	.500	.538	.625	9.0	3.0	.5	**2.5**°	**2.0**	16.5
2021	Minnesota	1	1	35.0	.273	**1.000**°	—	4.0	2.0	**3.0**°	.0	4.0	8.0
2023	Minnesota	3	3	36.0	.509	.333	**.867**	8.0	1.7	.7	1.3	2.3	23.7
2024	Minnesota	**12**°	**12**°	**38.8**°	.525	.414	.847	8.9	**3.3**	2.1	1.9	2.6	**23.8**
2025	Minnesota	5	5	34.8	.538	.280	.714	6.8	2.4	1.0	1.0	2.6	20.6
**Career**	6 years, 1 team	26	26	36.8	.521	.397	.805	8.3	2.8	1.5	1.7	2.5	21.2

=== College ===
Year	Team	GP	Points	FG%	3P%	FT%	RPG	APG	SPG	BPG	PPG
2015–16*	UConn	**38**	258	.533	.154	**.917**	5.2	.9	1.3	1.2	6.8
2016–17	UConn	37	754	**.678**	**.431**	.818	9.1	2.2	**1.7**	**2.1**	20.4°
2017–18	UConn	37	597	.583	.344	.786	7.4	3.3	1.6	1.7	16.1
2018–19	UConn	**38**	**792**	.612	.283	.697	**10.8**	**3.5**	1.5	1.7	**20.8**°
**Career**		150	2,401	.601	.303	.804	8.1	2.5	1.5	1.7	16.1

== Personal life ==
Off the court, Collier loves to read, especially mystery novels by Ruth Ware. In October 2019, she became engaged to Alex Bazzell, a basketball skills coach. In November 2021, they announced Collier was pregnant with their first child, a baby girl. On May 25, 2022, Collier gave birth to their daughter, Mila Sarah Bazzell. On October 7, 2022, Collier and Bazzell were married in St. Louis.

On October 4, 2024, a video showed Collier talking with a fan using ASL. Collier learned sign language while growing up.

Collier is the granddaughter of Gershon Collier, a Sierra Leone Creole lawyer, former ambassador to the United Nations, former ambassador to the United States, and, briefly, chief justice of Sierra Leone. He died two years before she was born. Her father, Gamal Collier, explained to the New York Times that he brought up Collier to know the "importance of self-sufficiency and responsibility and upholding the family name." Gershon had helped Sierra Leone gain its independence from the United Kingdom in 1961. Her father was briefly a professional boxer in five fights. During the WNBA season, her father has been helping support Collier and Bazzell with caring for his granddaughter before games to enable Collier to rest more.

Her younger brother Kai played football at Lindenwood University in St. Charles, Missouri.

== Business interests ==
Collier became the first WNBA player to join EcoAthletes to work on climate action. Collier is also partnering with Opill, the first over-the-counter birth control pill in the U.S., to promote reproductive rights and sexual health. In April 2025 she signed with the Jordan Brand after being with Nike for the previous five years. On July 17, 2026, Collier's PE shoe Napheesa Collier x Jordan Heir Series was released, featuring the blue and green of the Minnesota Lynx and the words "Mila" and "Queen Phee" on the tongues.
