= 2024 WNBA Finals =

Championship series of the 2024 WNBA season

| Team | Coach | Wins |
|---|---|---|
| New York Liberty | Sandy Brondello | 3 |
| Minnesota Lynx | Cheryl Reeve | 2 |
- Dates: October 10 – 20
- MVP: Jonquel Jones
- Eastern finals: New York Liberty defeated Las Vegas Aces 3–1 (Note: the semifinal rounds as of 2016 were not divided by conference)
- Western finals: Minnesota Lynx defeated Connecticut Sun 3–2

The 2024 WNBA Finals, officially the WNBA Finals 2024 presented by YouTube TV for sponsorship reasons, was the best-of-five championship series for the 2024 season of the Women's National Basketball Association (WNBA). The finals featured the first-seeded New York Liberty, who advanced to their second straight finals, and the second-seeded Minnesota Lynx. The Liberty defeated the Lynx in five games, winning their first WNBA Championship in franchise history.

This was the last WNBA Finals to use the best-of-five format as it expanded to a best-of-seven format in 2025.

== Road to the Finals ==
=== Standings ===
| # | Team | W | L | PCT | GB | Conf. | Home | Road | Cup |
|---|---|---|---|---|---|---|---|---|---|
| 1 | **yx** – New York Liberty | 32 | 8 | .800 | — | 16–4 | 16–4 | 16–4 | 5–0 |
| 2 | **cx** – Minnesota Lynx | 30 | 10 | .750 | 2 | 14–6 | 16–4 | 14–6 | 4–1 |
| 3 | **x** – Connecticut Sun | 28 | 12 | .700 | 4 | 14–6 | 14–6 | 14–6 | 4–1 |
| 4 | **x** – Las Vegas Aces | 27 | 13 | .675 | 5 | 12–8 | 13–7 | 14–6 | 2–3 |
| 5 | **x** – Seattle Storm | 25 | 15 | .625 | 7 | 13–7 | 14–6 | 11–9 | 4–1 |
| 6 | **x** – Indiana Fever | 20 | 20 | .500 | 12 | 11–9 | 12–8 | 8–12 | 3–2 |
| 7 | **x** – Phoenix Mercury | 19 | 21 | .475 | 13 | 10–10 | 10–10 | 9–11 | 3–2 |
| 8 | **x** – Atlanta Dream | 15 | 25 | .375 | 17 | 7–13 | 8–12 | 7–13 | 1–4 |
| 9 | **e** – Washington Mystics | 14 | 26 | .350 | 18 | 7–13 | 5–15 | 9–11 | 1–4 |
| 10 | **e** – Chicago Sky | 13 | 27 | .325 | 19 | 5–15 | 6–14 | 7–13 | 1–4 |
| 11 | **e** – Dallas Wings | 9 | 31 | .225 | 23 | 6–14 | 7–13 | 2–18 | 0–5 |
| 12 | **e** – Los Angeles Sparks | 8 | 32 | .200 | 24 | 5–15 | 5–15 | 3–17 | 2–3 |

Notes

(#) – League Standing
c – Commissioner's Cup winners
y – Regular Season Champion
x – Clinched playoff berth
e – Eliminated from playoff contention
Source: Overall standings and Commissioner's Cup Standings

=== Playoffs ===
**First round** Best-of-3
**1** | **New York Liberty** | **2**
8 | Atlanta Dream | 0
**4** | **Las Vegas Aces** | **2**
5 | Seattle Storm | 0
2 | **Minnesota Lynx** | **2**
7 | Phoenix Mercury | 0
3 | **Connecticut Sun** | **2**
6 | Indiana Fever | 0

**Semifinals**; Best-of-5
1 | **New York Liberty** | **3**
4 | Las Vegas Aces | 1
2 | **Minnesota Lynx** | **3**
3 | Connecticut Sun | 2

**Finals**; Best-of-5
1 | **New York Liberty** | **3**
2 | Minnesota Lynx | 2

- **Bold** – Series winner
- Italic – Team with home-court-advantage

In November 2021, the WNBA Board of Governors formalized a new playoff system that would structure the 2022 playoffs onward. The new playoff format scraps the single-elimination games of the first two rounds in favor of a best-of-3 quarterfinal round. As a result, all eight playoff teams, seeded according to overall regular season record regardless of conference (1 vs. 8, 2 vs. 7, 3 vs. 6, 4 vs. 5), will begin postseason play in the first round. Since 2016, seeds 3 and 4 received a bye to the second round (single game) and seeds 1 and 2 received a bye to the semifinals (best-of-5). In the first round series, the higher seeded team will host games 1 and 2, and the lower seeded team will host game 3 if necessary. In the semifinal round, no reseeding will take place, which means the winners of the 1 vs. 8 series will be paired with the winner of the 4 vs. 5 series as will the winners of the 2 vs. 7 and 3 vs. 6 series. The semifinal and final rounds will remain best-of-5 series in which the higher seeded team hosts games 1, 2 and (if necessary) 5 while the lower seeded team hosts games 3 and (if necessary) 4.

The New York Liberty qualified for the finals after finishing first in the regular season standings with a 32–8 regular season record. They defeated the Atlanta Dream 2–0 in the first round and the Las Vegas Aces 3–1 in the Semifinals. This was the Liberty's second appearance in the finals since 2002, and sixth overall.

The Minnesota Lynx qualified for the finals after finishing second in the regular season standings with a 30–10 regular season record. They defeated the Phoenix Mercury 2–0 in the first round and the Connecticut Sun 3–2 in the Semifinals. This was the Lynx seventh overall appearance in the finals, which is the most all time.

== Summary ==
The Liberty and the Lynx faced-off in the finals as the first and second overall seeds. This is the second year in a row where the top two seeds qualified for the finals. The Lynx won the regular season series between the two teams two games to one, and defeated New York in the 2024 WNBA Commissioner's Cup. The Liberty entered the series with two extra days of rest as they wrapped their Semifinal series on October 6, while the Lynx had to play a Game Five on October 8.

=== Game 1 ===
Courtney Williams's four-point play with 5.5 seconds remaining

The Finals started in New York with the Liberty dominating the first quarter, winning 32–19. Minnesota trailed by as many as eighteen-points in the second quarter, but won the quarter 17–12. The Liberty took an eight-point lead into halftime. The Lynx cut the lead to seven after winning a close third quarter 25–24. The Lynx turned it up in the fourth quarter, winning 23–16 in order to force overtime. Courtney Williams had a four-point play with 5.5 seconds left to put the Lynx up by one, but Breanna Stewart could only make one of two free throws with the final play of regulation. This was the first game since game two of the 2021 Finals to go into overtime. In a close frame, the Lynx stole an away win by winning overtime 11–9. The Lynx were the first team in playoff history to be down 15+ points in the final five minutes and come back to win the game.

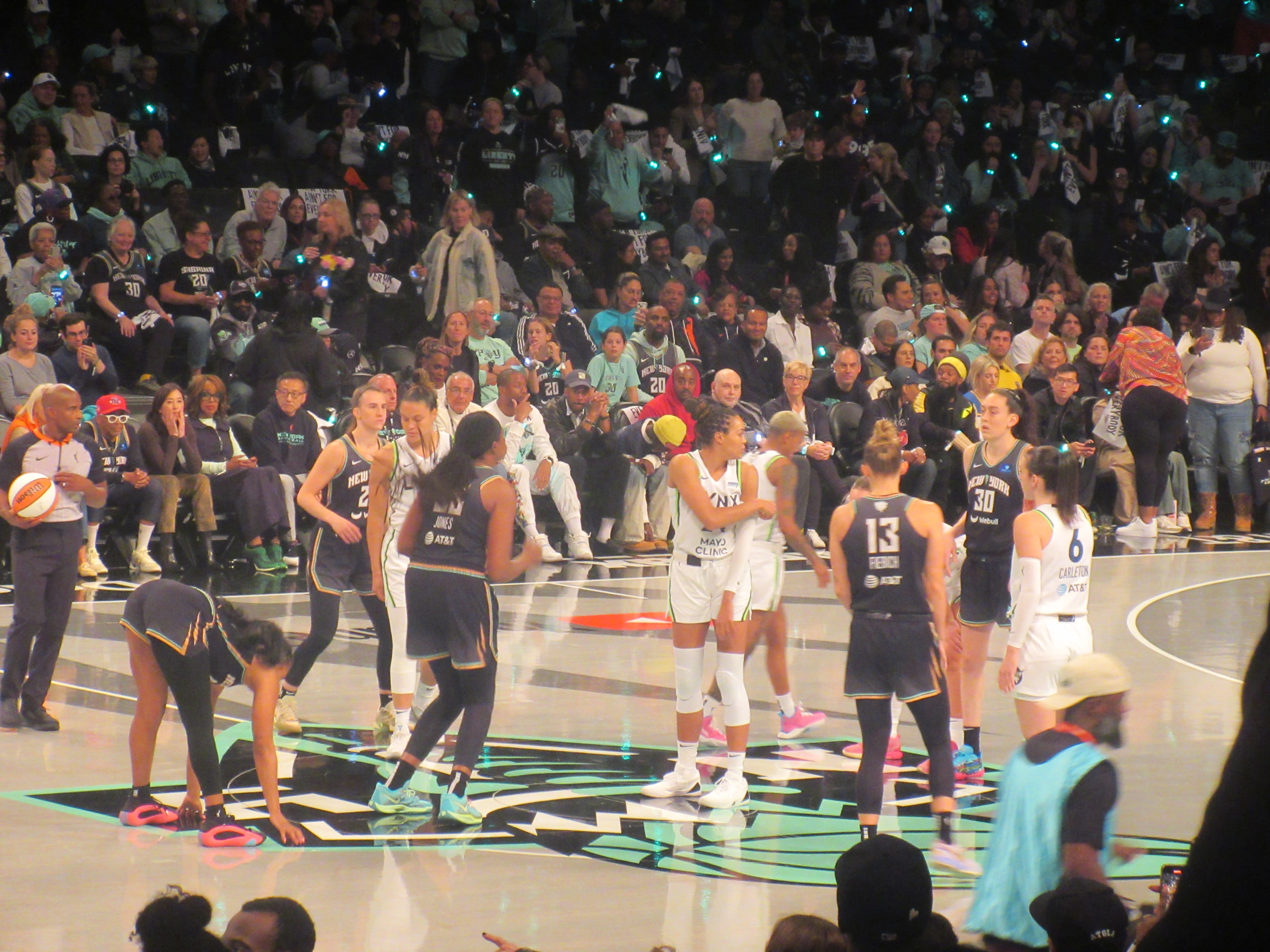
Right before tip-off of Game 1

The Lynx were led by Courtney Williams, who scored twenty-three points, and they had four players score in double figures. Kayla McBride scored twenty-two points, Napheesa Collier scored twenty-one points, and Natisha Hiedeman scored ten points, in just thirteen minutes of playing time. The Liberty also had four players score in double figures, and were led by Jonquel Jones who scored twenty-four points. Sabrina Ionescu scored nineteen points, Breanna Stewart scored eighteen points, and Leonie Fiebich scored seventeen points. Jones recorded ten rebounds to have the first double-double of the finals. Other stats revealed how close the game was with the Lynx winning points in the paint 42–36, bench points 15–10, and the turnover battle 12–15. However, the Liberty were ahead in fast break points 19–17 and rebounds 44–32.

The game had the largest television viewing audience of any WNBA Finals Game 1 with 1.1 million viewers and 1.5 million at the peak.

ESPN, TSN3

October 10
8:00 p.m.

Box Score

New York Liberty 93, Minnesota Lynx 95 (OT)
Scoring by quarter: 32–19, 12–17, 24–25, 16–23, Overtime: 9–11
| Pts: Jonquel Jones (24); Rebs: Jonquel Jones (10); Asts: Fiebich/Laney-Hamilton/Vandersloot (4) | Pts: Courtney Williams (23); Rebs: Alanna Smith (9); Asts: Courtney Williams (5) |

Barclays Center
Attendance: 17,732
Referees: Isaac Barnett (Crew Chief), Eric Brewton (Referee), Jenna Reneau (Umpire), Fatou Cissoku-Stephens (Alternate)

=== Game 2 ===
Game two in New York began with the Liberty coming out strong and going on a 12–0 run. They would end up winning the first quarter 31–21. The Lynx came back in the second quarter and it finished even at 18–18. The Liberty lead by as many as seventeen in the first half, and took a ten-point lead into halftime. The third quarter was low-scoring and the Lynx prevailed 14–12 to cut the Liberty's lead to eight heading into the final frame. The Lynx cut the lead to three points during the fourth quarter, but ultimately the Liberty pulled away and won the fourth quarter 19–13 and took the game by fourteen points. The Liberty evened the series at one game a piece in front of the largest crowd to ever attend a Liberty game at the Barclays Center, with 18,046 fans.

The Liberty had four players score in double figures and were led by Breanna Stewart who scored twenty-one points. Betnijah Laney-Hamilton scored twenty, Sabrina Ionescu added fifteen, and Jonquel Jones had fourteen points. Stewart recorded seven steals to set the record for steals in a WNBA Finals game. The Lynx had three players score in double figures, and were led by Napheesa Collier who scored sixteen points. Courtney Williams scored fifteen points, and Alanna Smith scored fourteen points. As in game one, the Lynx won the points in the paint battle 34–28. Both benches contributed little as the Liberty's bench scores more points, 7–5. The Liberty scored twenty-six points off the Lynx' twenty turnovers, and the Lynx scored seventeen points off the Liberty's sixteen turnovers. The Liberty won the rebounding battle 34–27.

This game had the most viewers of any WNBA Finals game on ABC with 1.34 million viewers and a peak of 1.82 million viewers. This audience is 93% higher than last year's finals average for ABC. It was the most viewed WNBA Finals game in 23 years.

ABC, SN

October 13
3:00 p.m.

Box Score

New York Liberty 80, Minnesota Lynx 66
Scoring by quarter: 31–21, 18–18, 12–14, 19–13
| Pts: Breanna Stewart (21); Rebs: Jonquel Jones (9); Asts: Ionescu/Stewart (5) | Pts: Napheesa Collier (16); Rebs: Napheesa Collier (8); Asts: Courtney Williams (8) |

Barclays Center
Attendance: 18,046
Referees: Roy Gulbeyan (Crew Chief), Randy Richardson (Referee), Tiara Cruse (Umpire), Fatou Cissoku-Stephens (Alternate)

=== Game 3 ===
The series moved to Minnesota for game three and the Lynx took advantage of having the home court, winning the first quarter 28–18. The Liberty's defense improved in the second quarter, and they limited the Lynx to fifteen points in the quarter, and the Liberty scored seventeen to win the quarter. The Lynx lead by as many as fifteen in the first half and took an eight-point lead into halftime. The Liberty stormed out of the halftime break and won the third quarter 26–19 to cut the lead to one-point. The game continued to be back and forth during the fourth quarter and Sabrina Ionescu hit a three-point shot with one second remaining to secure the quarter and the game for the Liberty. The Liberty won the fourth quarter 19–15 and game three by three points. The Liberty drew within one game of winning their first WNBA title in front of a record crowd of 19,521 at the Target Center.

The Liberty had four players score in double figures, and were led by Breanna Stewart who scored thirty points. Leonie Fiebich, Sabrina Ionescu, and Jonquel Jones all scored thirteen points. Stewart grabbed eleven rebounds to earn her first double-double of the finals. The Lynx also had four players score in double figures, and were led by Napheesa Collier with twenty-two points. Kayla McBride added nineteen points, Bridget Carleton scored fourteen points, and Courtney Williams scored twelve points. Game three saw the points in the paint tied at twenty eight, the Lynx led in fast break points 11–5, the Liberty won bench points 9–8 and the Lynx won the turnover battle 10–16. The rebounding battle was much closer as well, with the Liberty winning 33–32.

ESPN, TSN1/3/4 (Note: TSN3 will join in progress at 9:00 p.m.)

October 16
8:00 p.m.

Box Score

Minnesota Lynx 77, New York Liberty 80
Scoring by quarter: 28–18, 15–17, 19–26, 15–19
| Pts: Napheesa Collier (22); Rebs: Napheesa Collier (9); Asts: Courtney Williams (8) | Pts: Breanna Stewart (30); Rebs: Breanna Stewart (11); Asts: Sabrina Ionescu (6) |

Target Center
Attendance: 19,521
Referees: Maj Forsberg (Crew Chief), Tim Greene (Referee), Angelica Suffren (Umpire), Randy Richardson (Alternate)

=== Game 4 ===
Game four began with the Lynx facing elimination at home. The first quarter was a very back and forth affair and the quarter ended tied at 23. The second quarter did little to separate the teams and the Lynx won the quarter 23–22 to take just a one-point lead into halftime. The third quarter was a lower scoring affair, but did nothing to separate the teams, as it ended tied at 18. Defense continued to dominate a tight fourth quarter, and the Lynx prevailed in the quarter 18–17. The Lynx won game four by two points and forced a game five in New York. Defense was key for the Lynx as they held the Liberty stars Breanna Stewart and Sabrina Ionescu to a combined 10–36 shooting. The two were also 0–9 on three point attempts. Bridget Carleton was fouled with two seconds remaining, and made both shots. The Liberty had possession to end the game, but Ionescu was unable to make another game-winning shot.

The Lynx had all five starters score in double figures, and were led by Kayla McBride who scored nineteen points. Courtney Williams scored fifteen points, Napheesa Collier scored fourteen points, and both Bridget Carleton and Alanna Smith contributed twelve points. All five Liberty starters also scored in double figures and they were led by Jonquel Jones who scored twenty-one points. Rookie Leonie Fiebich scored nineteen points, Breanna Stewart scored eleven points, and both Sabrina Ionescu and Betnijah Laney-Hamilton scored ten points. Stewart recorded eleven rebounds for her second double-double of the finals. The Liberty again won the rebounding battle 40–31, they also won fast break points 12–11, and points in the paint 38–26. The Lynx won the turnover battle 12–15, bench points 10–9, and scored more points off turnovers 19–10.

ESPN, TSN2

October 18
8:00 p.m.

Box Score

Minnesota Lynx 82, New York Liberty 80
Scoring by quarter: 23–23, 23–22, 18–18, 18–17
| Pts: Kayla McBride (19); Rebs: Napheesa Collier (9); Asts: Courtney Williams (7) | Pts: Jonquel Jones (21); Rebs: Breanna Stewart (11); Asts: Fiebich/Ionescu (5) |

Target Center
Attendance: 19,210
Referees: Isaac Barnett (Crew Chief), Eric Bretton (Referee), Tiara Cruse (Umpire), Randy Richardson (Alternate)

=== Game 5 ===
The deciding game five in New York began with the Lynx dominating the first quarter, winning 19–10. New York clawed back in the second quarter and won the quarter 17–15. The generally low-scoring half saw the Lynx take a seven-point lead into halftime. The Liberty recovered after the break and won the third quarter 20–10 to take a three-point lead into the final frame. However, the Lynx would not give up and won the fourth quarter 16–13, leaving the game tied at sixty. The Lynx led by as many as twelve points in the first half, and led in the final minute of regulation but could not hold off the Liberty. Liberty stars Breanna Stewart and Sabrina Ionescu again struggled, going a combined 5–34 from the field. The Liberty won the overtime period 7–2, during which Collier fouled out. The Liberty led the league in three pointers during the regular season, but only managed to make two in game 5, one by Ionescu in the fourth quarter, and one by Fiebich to start overtime. The Liberty won game five by five points to claim their first WNBA title in their sixth finals appearance, which also marked the first championship for a professional basketball team in the New York area since the New York Nets won their second championship in the ABA in 1976.

The Liberty had four players score in double figures and were led by Finals MVP Jonquel Jones who scored seventeen points. Leonie Fiebich, Nyara Sabally, and Breanna Stewart all added thirteen points. Stewart also had fifteen rebounds to record her third double-double of the Finals. The Lynx only had two players score in double figures and were led by Napheesa Collier, who scored twenty-two points. Kayla McBride scored twenty-one points. The Liberty led in points in the paint, 44–38. They won fast break points 4–2, bench points 15–6, and won the turnover battle 12–16. Just as in very other game in the finals, the Liberty won the rebounding battle 44–33. The Liberty got a major boost in game five from their bench, as Nyara Sabally played seventeen minutes, a playoff high. She and Kayla Thornton contributed defensively as well.

The game's officiating came under heavy scrutiny, particularly the amount of free throw attempts the Liberty got compared to the Lynx and the foul call on Lynx center Alanna Smith with 5.2 seconds left in regulation, which led to Breanna Stewart making two free throw attempts that led the game into overtime. In the post-game's news conference, Reeve claims the game was stolen from them and called for a third party that should be included in challenges going forward. Several prominent sports media figures as well as NBA and WNBA players such as LeBron James, Damian Lillard, Isaiah Thomas, Shakira Austin, and Rex Chapman all criticized the way the referees handled the game, with some pointing out Smith's minimal contact on her foul call and how Stewart traveled the ball up to her. Sabreena Merchant for The Athletic wrote the officiating will "leave a stain on what was otherwise an incredible series".

ESPN, SN1

October 20
8:00 p.m.

Box Score

New York Liberty 67, Minnesota Lynx 62 (OT)
Scoring by quarter: 10–19, 17–15, 20–10, 13–16, Overtime: 7–2
| Pts: Jonquel Jones (17); Rebs: Breanna Stewart (15); Asts: Sabrina Ionescu (8) | Pts: Napheesa Collier (22); Rebs: Alanna Smith (8); Asts: Kayla McBride (5) |

Barclays Center
Attendance: 18,090
Referees: Roy Gulbeyan (Crew Chief), Maj Forsberg (Referee), Tim Greene (Umpire), Isaac Barnett (Alternate)

== Team rosters ==
2024 Minnesota Lynx roster
Players
Coaches

| Pos. | No. | Nat. | Name | Height | Weight | DOB | From | Yrs |
|---|---|---|---|---|---|---|---|---|
| G/F | 6 | (Canada) | Carleton, Bridget | 6' 1" (1.85m) | 190 lb (86kg) | 1997-05-22 | Iowa State | 5 |
| F | 24 | (United States) | Collier, Napheesa | 6' 2" (1.88m) | 185 lb (84kg) | 1996-09-23 | Connecticut | 5 |
| G | 0 | (France) | Époupa, Olivia | 5' 5" (1.65m) | 119 lb (54kg) | 1994-04-30 | France | R |
| G | 2 | (United States) | Hiedeman, Natisha | 5' 8" (1.73m) | 135 lb (61kg) | 1997-02-10 | Marquette | 5 |
| F | 22 | (United States) | Hines-Allen, Myisha | 6' 1" (1.85m) | 200 lb (91kg) | 1996-05-30 | Louisville | 6 |
| G/F | 14 | (Hungary) | Juhász, Dorka | 6' 5" (1.96m) | 192 lb (87kg) | 1999-12-18 | Connecticut | 1 |
| G | 21 | (United States) | McBride, Kayla | 5' 10" (1.78m) | 186 lb (84kg) | 1992-06-25 | Notre Dame | 10 |
| G | 1 | (United States) | Miller, Diamond | 6' 3" (1.91m) | 163 lb (74kg) | 2001-02-11 | Maryland | 1 |
| F | 35 | (United States) | Pili, Alissa | 6' 2" (1.88m) | 235 lb (107kg) | 2001-06-08 | Utah | R |
| F | 8 | (Australia) | Smith, Alanna | 6' 4" (1.93m) | 180 lb (82kg) | 1996-09-10 | Stanford | 5 |
| G | 10 | (United States) | Williams, Courtney | 5' 8" (1.73m) | 133 lb (60kg) | 1994-05-11 | South Florida | 8 |
| F | 9 | (Italy) | Zandalasini, Cecilia | 6' 2" (1.88m) | 175 lb (79kg) | 1996-03-16 | Italy | 2 |
| F | | (France) | Hirsch, Maïa (DP) | 6' 5" (1.96m) | | 2003-11-13 | France |

Head coach
(United States) Cheryl Reeve (La Salle)
Assistant coaches
(United States) Katie Smith (Ohio State)
(United States) Rebekkah Brunson (Georgetown)
(United States) Elaine Powell (LSU)
Athletic trainer
(United States) Chuck Barta (UW–La Crosse)
Assistant trainer
(United States) Brandi BlueArm (Minnesota State)

Legend

- (C) Team captain
- (DP) Unsigned draft pick
- (FA) Free agent
- (S) Suspended
- Injured

=== Depth ===
| Pos. | Starter | Bench |
|---|---|---|
| PG | Courtney Williams | Natisha Hiedeman; Olivia Époupa |
| SG | Kayla McBride | Diamond Miller |
| SF | Bridget Carleton | Cecilia Zandalasini |
| PF | Napheesa Collier | Myisha Hines-Allen; Alissa Pili |
| C | Alanna Smith | Dorka Juhász |

2024 New York Liberty roster
Players
Coaches

| Pos. | No. | Nat. | Name | Height | Weight | DOB | From | Yrs |
|---|---|---|---|---|---|---|---|---|
| G/F | 2 | (United States) | Burke, Kennedy | 6' 1" (1.85m) | 182 lb (83kg) | 1997-02-14 | UCLA | 4 |
| G | 1 | (United States) | Davis, Marquesha | 6' 0" (1.83m) | | 2001-05-29 | Mississippi | R |
| G | 18 | (Croatia) | Dojkić, Ivana | 5' 11" (1.8m) | 154 lb (70kg) | 1997-12-24 | Croatia | 1 |
| F | 13 | (Germany) | Fiebich, Leonie | 6' 4" (1.93m) | | 2000-01-10 | Germany | R |
| G | 20 | (United States) | Ionescu, Sabrina | 5' 11" (1.8m) | 165 lb (75kg) | 1997-12-06 | Oregon | 4 |
| C | 35 | (Bosnia and Herzegovina) | Jones, Jonquel | 6' 6" (1.98m) | 215 lb (98kg) | 1994-01-05 | George Washington | 7 |
| G/F | 44 | (United States) | Laney-Hamilton, Betnijah | 6' 0" (1.83m) | 166 lb (75kg) | 1993-10-29 | Rutgers | 8 |
| C | 8 | (Germany) | Sabally, Nyara | 6' 5" (1.96m) | 204 lb (93kg) | 2000-02-26 | Oregon | 1 |
| G | 0 | (United States) | Sherrod, Jaylyn | 5' 7" (1.7m) | | 2001-10-21 | Colorado | R |
| F | 30 | (United States) | Stewart, Breanna | 6' 4" (1.93m) | 170 lb (77kg) | 1994-08-27 | Connecticut | 7 |
| F | 5 | (United States) | Thornton, Kayla | 6' 1" (1.85m) | 188 lb (85kg) | 1992-10-20 | UTEP | 8 |
| G | 22 | (Hungary) | Vandersloot, Courtney | 5' 8" (1.73m) | 137 lb (62kg) | 1989-02-08 | Gonzaga | 13 |

Head coach
(Australia) Sandy Brondello (Western Sydney)
Assistant coaches
(Germany) Olaf Lange
(United States) Roneeka Hodges (Florida State)
(United States) Zach O'Brien (Saint Joseph's College of Maine)
Athletic trainer
(United States) Terri Acosta
Strength and conditioning coach
(United States) Emily Zaler

Legend

- (C) Team captain
- (DP) Unsigned draft pick
- (FA) Free agent
- (S) Suspended
- Injured

=== Depth ===
| Pos. | Starter | Bench |
|---|---|---|
| PG | Courtney Vandersloot | Ivana Dojkić; Jaylyn Sherrod |
| SG | Sabrina Ionescu | Kennedy Burke; Marquesha Davis |
| SF | Betnijah Laney-Hamilton | Kayla Thornton |
| PF | Breanna Stewart | Leonie Fiebich |
| C | Jonquel Jones | Nyara Sabally |
