= Breanna Stewart =

American basketball player (born 1994)

- Stewart with the United States national team in 2026

No. 30 – New York Liberty
- Position: Power forward
- League: WNBA

Personal information
- Born: August 27, 1994 (age 32) Syracuse, New York, U.S.
- Listed height: 6 ft 4 in (1.93 m)
- Listed weight: 170 lb (77 kg)

Career information
- High school: Cicero – North Syracuse (Cicero, New York)
- College: UConn (2012–2016)
- WNBA draft: 2016: 1st round, 1st overall pick
- Drafted by: Seattle Storm
- Playing career: 2016–present

Career history
- 2016–2022: Seattle Storm
- 2016–2018: Shanghai Baoshan Dahua
- 2018–2019: Dynamo Kursk
- 2020–2021: UMMC Ekaterinburg
- 2022–2023: Fenerbahçe
- 2023–present: New York Liberty
- 2025–present: Mist BC
- 2026: Fenerbahçe

Career highlights
- 3× WNBA champion (2018, 2020, 2024); 2× WNBA Finals MVP (2018, 2020); 2× WNBA MVP (2018, 2023); 8× WNBA All-Star (2017, 2018, 2021–2026); 7× All-WNBA First Team (2018, 2020–2024, 2026); All-WNBA Second Team (2016); 3× WNBA All-Defensive First Team (2022–2024); 5× WNBA All-Defensive Second Team (2016, 2020, 2021, 2025, 2026); WNBA Rookie of the Year (2016); WNBA All-Rookie Team (2016); 3× WNBA Commissioner's Cup champion (2021, 2023, 2026); 2× WNBA Commissioner's Cup MVP (2021, 2026); WNBA scoring leader (2022); WNBA 25th Anniversary Team (2021); Unrivaled champion (2026); Unrivaled Finals MVP (2026); 2× FIBA Women's World Cup MVP (2018, 2026); Olympics MVP (2021); 3× EuroLeague champion (2021, 2023, 2026); EuroLeague Regular Season MVP (2019); 2× EuroLeague Final Four MVP (2021, 2023); All-EuroLeague First Team (2023); Turkish Super League champion (2023); Russian Premier League champion (2021); Sports Illustrated Sportsperson of the Year (2020); 4× NCAA champion (2013–2016); 4× NCAA Tournament MOP (2013–2016); Senior CLASS Award (2016); 3× Naismith College Player of the Year (2014–2016); 3× Honda Sports Award (2014–2016); Honda-Broderick Cup (2016); 3× USBWA National Player of the Year (2014–2016); 3× AP Player of the Year (2014–2016); 2× John R. Wooden Award (2015, 2016); 2× Wade Trophy (2015, 2016); James E. Sullivan Award (2015); 3× WBCA Coaches' All-American (2014–2016); 3× First-team All-American – AP (2014–2016); 3× All-American – USBWA (2014–2016); 3× AAC Player of the Year (2014–2016); 2× AAC Tournament MVP (2014, 2016); 3× First-team All-AAC (2014–2016); Big East All-Freshman Team (2013); FIBA Under-19 World Cup MVP (2013); Gatorade Female Athlete of the Year (2012); Gatorade National Player of the Year (2012); Naismith Prep Player of the Year (2012); USA Basketball Athlete of the Year (2011, 2013, 2018); Morgan Wootten Player of the Year (2012); McDonald's All-American (2012); MaxPreps National Player of the Year (2012); Miss New York Basketball (2012)
- Stats at WNBA.com
- Stats at Basketball Reference
Medals
Women's basketball
Representing the United States
Olympic Games
Gold medal – first place	2016 Rio de Janeiro	Team
Gold medal – first place	2020 Tokyo	Team
Gold medal – first place	2024 Paris	Team
World Cup
Gold medal – first place	2014 Turkey
Gold medal – first place	2018 Spain
Gold medal – first place	2022 Australia
Gold medal – first place	2026 Germany
Pan American Games
Silver medal – second place	2015 Toronto	Team
FIBA Under-19 World Cup
Gold medal – first place	2013 Lithuania	Team
Gold medal – first place	2011 Chile	Team
FIBA Under-18 Americas Championship
Gold medal – first place	2012 Puerto Rico	Team
FIBA U17 World Cup
Gold medal – first place	2010 France	Team
FIBA Americas U16 Championship
Gold medal – first place	2009 Mexico	Team

Breanna Mackenzie Stewart (/briːˈænə/ bree-ANN-ə; born August 27, 1994), nicknamed "Stewie", is an American professional basketball player for the New York Liberty of the Women's National Basketball Association (WNBA) and for the Mist of Unrivaled. She is one of the most accomplished basketball players in history. Stewart is a co-founder of the Unrivaled basketball league together with Napheesa Collier.

In high school, Stewart was the National Gatorade Player of the Year, the Gatorade Female Athlete of the Year, and a McDonald's All-American. She led the University of Connecticut Huskies to four consecutive national championships, was named the Final Four's most outstanding player a record four times, and was a three-time consensus national player of the year.

She was the first overall pick in the 2016 WNBA draft and was named the 2016 WNBA Rookie of the Year. She was named the WNBA MVP in 2018 and 2023, and was named an All-Star in 2017, 2018, 2021, 2022, 2023, 2024, and 2025. She led the Storm to two championships in 2018 and 2020, and received the WNBA Finals MVP award both times. She also won the 2024 WNBA championship with the New York Liberty. In 2021, Stewart was named to The W25 as one of the top 25 players of the WNBA's first 25 years.

Stewart is a three-time EuroLeague champion and was MVP of the league in 2019, as well as winning national league titles in Russia and Turkey.

As a member of the U.S. national team, Stewart has won gold medals in the 2016, 2020, and 2024 Olympics and at the 2014, 2018, 2022, and 2026 FIBA World Cups.

== Early life ==
Stewart was born Breanna Mackenzie Baldwin in Syracuse, New York, to a single mother, Heather Baldwin. Her biological father was not involved in her life, and her mother worked multiple jobs to support herself and her daughter. When Stewart was a toddler, her mother began dating Brian Stewart, who later adopted Stewart after marrying Baldwin. She has a younger half-brother, Connor.

Stewart began playing basketball at an early age. Due to her height her coaches wanted her inside as a rebounder, but her father encouraged her to practice ball handling skills and a perimeter shooting ability. She started a daily routine of dribbling around her block, wearing headphones, for a mile. Her routine improved her ball handling to the point she routinely dribbled behind her back or between her legs.

In a 2017 essay in The Players' Tribune, Stewart publicly revealed that she had been a victim of sexual abuse from age 9 to 11. She reported the abuse to her parents, who immediately called police. The perpetrator, who was married to her maternal aunt, confessed to the abuse and ultimately served prison time.

== High school ==
Stewart attended Cicero–North Syracuse High School (C-NS) in Cicero, where she played for head coach Eric Smith. She was nicknamed "Bean" by her teammates, and "6–10" because of her wingspan. Stewart first played for the high school team while still in eighth grade. She played as a starter in most games, and averaged nine points, almost nine rebounds and seven blocks per game. In her freshman year, she almost doubled her point production, scoring 17 points per game. That year, her team had a 21–3 record, and made it to the regional final game.

In her sophomore year, she was a starter in every game, and upped her scoring average to 22 points per game. In that year, her team's record was 18–4. As a junior, she helped lead her team to the state AA public school title, with a 22–3 record for the year. Stewart averaged 24 points and 15 rebounds for the season. During her junior year, she announced that she would be attending the University of Connecticut. The day after the announcement, she dunked the ball in a game against Baldwinsville, her first career dunk. Stewart achieved a milestone on January 31, 2012, when she scored her 2,000th point, as part of a 31–0 run against Auburn.

Stewart was selected as a member of the 2012 McDonald's All-American team, which represented the 24 best female high school basketball players. The selected players were grouped into two squads that competed in the annual McDonald's All-American Game, held that year in Chicago. Stewart was selected to the 2012 Women's Basketball Coaches Association (WBCA) High School Coaches' All-America Team. The top 20 high school players in the country were named as WBCA All-Americans and were eligible to play in the all-star game. She participated in the 2012 WBCA High School All-America Game, scoring 10 points. Stewart was named the 2012 Naismith High School Girls' Player of the Year, the honor awarded by the Atlanta Tipoff Club to the best female high school basketball player in the country. In March 2012, in a surprise presentation by Tamika Catchings, Stewart received the Gatorade National Girls Basketball Player of the Year award. Stewart was one of six finalists for the Gatorade High School Athlete of the Year.

=== High school tournaments ===
In addition to regularly scheduled post-season tournaments, the success of her high school team led to invitations to prominent national tournaments. In 2010, the C-NS team traveled to Philadelphia, New Jersey and Disney World; in 2011, the team went to the Nike Tournament of Champions in Phoenix, Arizona, considered the "premier showcase of all high school girls tournaments"; and in 2012, the Northstars played in a Basketball Hall of Fame Tournament in Springfield, Massachusetts.

==== Tournament of Champions ====
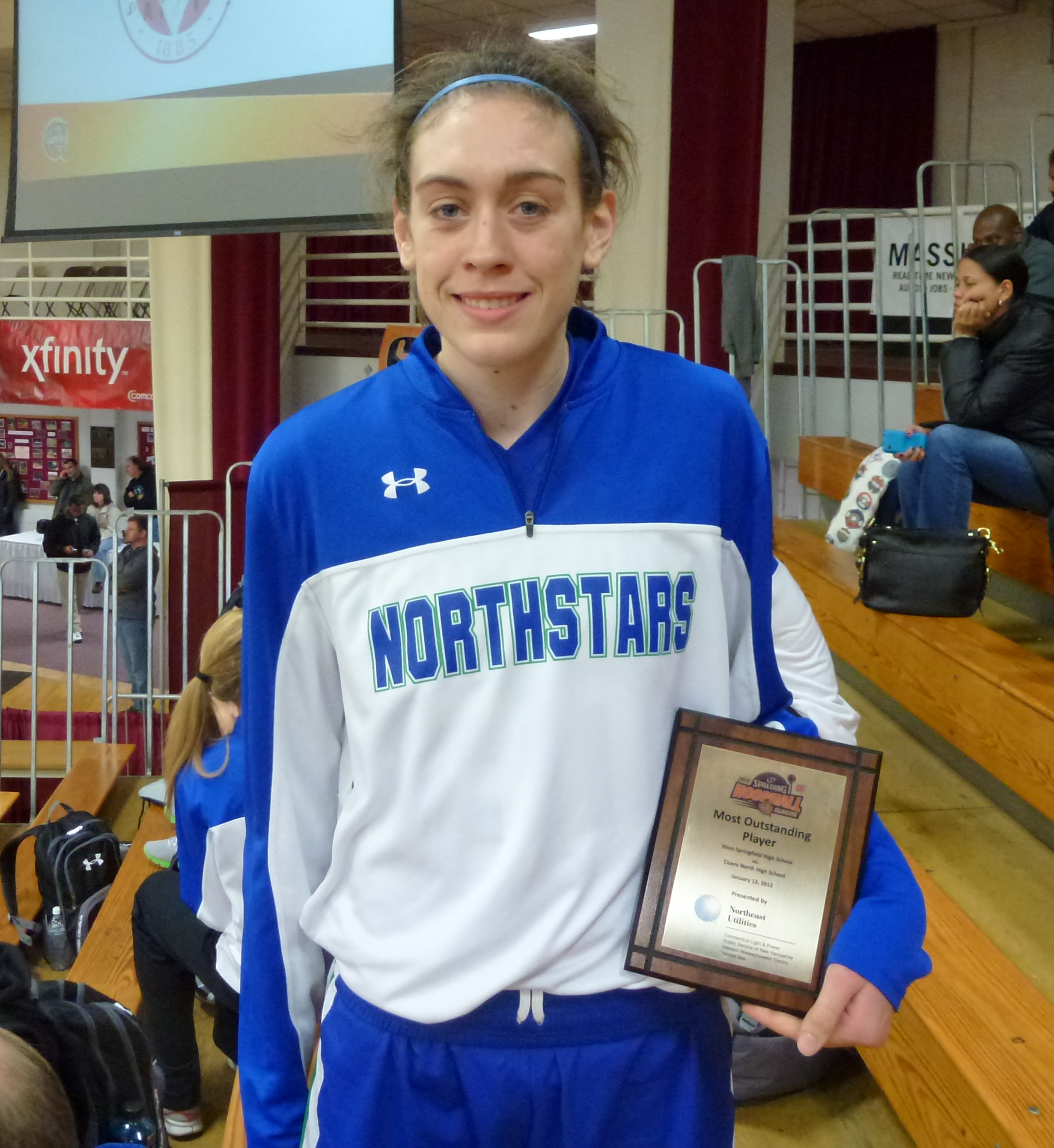
Breanna Stewart at the 2012 Hoophall Classic

The Tournament of Champions is an annual event, since 1997, showcasing the best high school girls basketball teams. The 2011 event, held in Phoenix, Arizona, included 96 of the best basketball programs in the country. The C-NS team was assigned to the Smith Division, where they faced Bolingbrook High School, considered to be the number 1 team by USA Today. Despite being viewed as a 30-point underdog, Stewart helped her team to the first round upset, scoring 15 points in a 43–40 win.

In the quarter-final game, Stewart scored 29 points and had 19 rebounds to help the team beat the number 22 ranked team in the country, Dr. Phillips High School from Orlando, Florida. Although double-teamed, she scored ten points in a 12–0 run that gave C-NS a commanding 23-point lead early in the fourth quarter. That win secured a place in the semi-finals of the division. In the semi-final game, C-NS faced St. Mary's, the number 2 ranked team in the country. Stewart had 33 points and 16 rebounds, but it was not enough to overcome the scoring of the eventual champion of the tournament. Although the team lost that game, Stewart's overall performance earned her the most outstanding player of the tournament honors. Stewart was viewed as an offensive threat in the low post, high post and perimeter, and was effective as a defender because of her long wingspan.

==== 2012 Hoophall Classic ====
Stewart's Northstars team were invited to play in the annual Hoophall Classic; the event was held in Springfield, Massachusetts, and typically featured some of the best high school teams in the country. Their opponents were the local West Springfield team, not nationally ranked, but 8–0 at the time of the meeting. The result was not close, as C-NS beat West Springfield 60–20, with Stewart alone scoring more points than the opposition. Stewart ended the game with 22 points, 18 rebounds and seven blocks, despite leaving the game in the third period and not returning. Her performance earned her the Most Outstanding Player award for the event.

== College career ==
Stewart was recruited by many schools, but after a campus visit to UConn in 2011, she told the coaching staff, "I would like to commit if you'd take me." Stewart signed her commitment letter on the hood of her car, then gave it to her father at his office to fax to the school.

=== Freshman year ===
Stewart started her freshman year in strong form, scoring at least 20 points in three of her first four games. She scored a total of 169 points in her first ten games, which broke Maya Moore's record for most points in a player's first 10 career games. However, her output slowed, and her scoring average dropped below ten points for her last eighteen regular season games. In March 2013, she started early morning sessions with Chris Dailey, associate head coach, to concentrate on shooting and post moves. She came back strong in the Big East tournament, with a total of 51 points, matching the number scored by Diana Taurasi in her tournament debut. Her strong performance continued in the NCAA tournament. She did not play in the first round, due to a calf injury, but scored 105 points in the last five games, earning her the award of the Most Outstanding Player of the Final Four, the first freshman to win the award since 1987.

=== Sophomore year ===
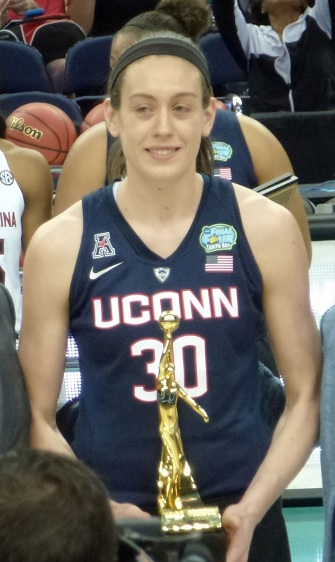
Stewart receiving the Wade Trophy in 2015.

Stewart continued her stellar play in her sophomore year; her coaches noticed that she was demanding the ball more often, something she occasionally did as a freshman, but usually only if she thought she was playing well. By the end of her sophomore year, she was named the American Athletic Conference Player of the Year in the league's first season after the split of the original Big East Conference, which she went on to win the following two seasons. Additionally, she was named AP Player of the Year, only the third time in history it went to a sophomore. Stewart started and played in all 40 games of 2013–2014 season. She led the team at 19.4 points and 2.8 blocks per game, was second on the team with 8.1 rebounds per game, and fourth on the squad at 49.7 percent shooting and her 291 field goals made was the third-highest single-season total in UConn history. Her 324 rebounds marked the 12th-highest single-season total in school history, and her 110 blocks was the third-highest mark.

=== Junior year ===
Stewart earned American Athletic Conference Player of the Year honors for the second straight year in 2014–15, marking the fifth time a Husky was selected as the conference player of the year multiple times. She elevated nearly every aspect of her game during UConn's nine-game run through the postseason, averaging 18.1 points on 53.3 percent shooting to go along with 10.7 rebounds, and made 42.1 percent (8–19) of her attempts from beyond the 3-point arc during postseason action. She entered her senior year in 11th place on UConn's all-time scoring list with 1,960 career points, only 30 points behind Renee Montgomery's 10th-place total. She entered 2015–16 in fifth place on UConn's all-time blocked shots list with 288 career rejections and finished the season with 856 career rebounds, which is the 10th-highest total in UConn history.

=== Senior year ===
In her final season at UConn, Stewart posted career highs in rebounds (8.7 rpg), assists (4.0 apg) and blocks (126) while shooting 57.9 percent from the floor, sweeping all possible individual honors: she won her third straight Naismith College Player of the Year award, Wade Trophy, Associated Press Women's College Basketball Player of the Year award, USBWA Women's National Player of the Year award; she was also voted American Athletic Player of the Year (third time) and a third straight unanimous First-Team All-American in WBCA, USBWA and AP polls. She was the first-ever unanimous pick for AP Player of the Year and the first-ever three-time AP Player of the Year. In leading UConn to another national championship, she was part of the first four-time national championship class in NCAA history and also became the first player to be named the Final Four Most Outstanding Player four times. In her college career Stewart won 151 games and lost 5, which included four straight national championships. She is the first NCAA basketball player ever to tally 400 assists and block 400 shots. She was one of only six Huskies with at least 1,000 points and 1,000 rebounds. Stewart finished her career second on UConn's all-time scoring list at 2,676 career points, fourth with 1,179 career rebounds, and first in blocks (414).

In October 2025, the Associated Press selected Stewart as one of the greatest collegiate players in the women's poll era alongside Caitlin Clark, Cheryl Miller, Candace Parker, and Diana Taurasi as the starting five players.

== Professional career ==
Stewart's professional career has been split by summer stints in the WNBA where she has collected three titles, as well as in China, Russia, Türkiye while gaining two EuroLeague championships.

=== WNBA ===
==== Seattle Storm ====
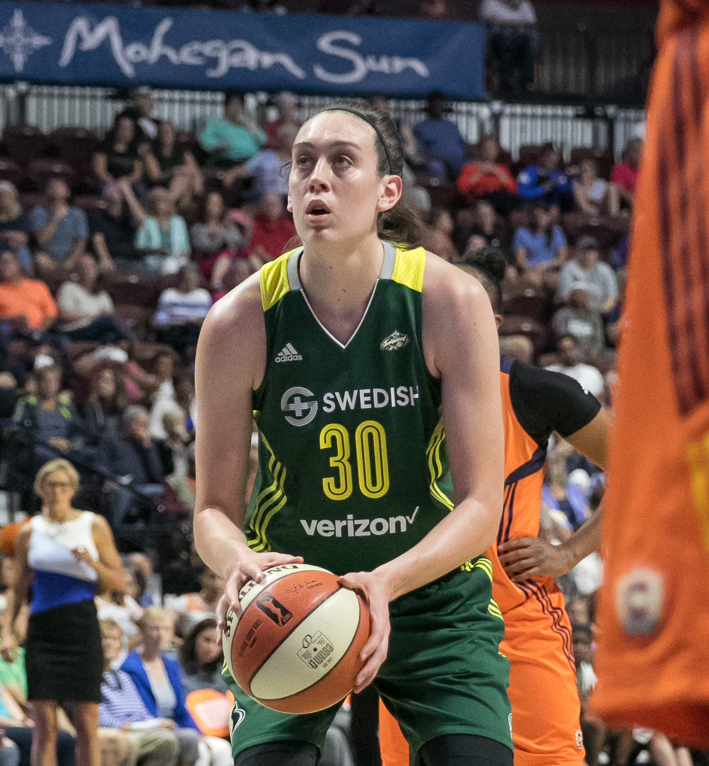
Stewart with the Seattle Storm in 2017

Stewart was drafted first overall in the 2016 WNBA draft by the Seattle Storm. With the Storm, she played alongside superstar veteran point guard Sue Bird. Stewart immediately made an impact in the league as she scored 23 points in her debut game against the Los Angeles Sparks. As the season progressed, Stewart continued to dominate offensively as she scored a career-high 38 points in a win against the Atlanta Dream, which is the second most points scored in a game in franchise history, behind Lauren Jackson's 47 points. Stewart averaged 18.3 points per game, 9.3 rebounds per game and 1.8 blocks per game by the end of the 2016 season. She swept the Rookie of the Month awards for the entire season leading up to her winning the WNBA Rookie of the Year Award by a landslide. Stewart also broke the WNBA record for most defensive rebounds in a season with 277, surpassing Lisa Leslie's record in 2004. Despite the record, Stewart didn't win the rebounding title, sharing the top spot with Tina Charles for most rebounds, who led the league in rebounds per game average. Her season performance helped lead the Storm back to the playoffs for the first time in 3 years with the number 7 seed in the league, but lost in the first round elimination game to the Atlanta Dream. Stewart won the 2016 ESPY Award for Best Female Athlete. The other nominees were Elena Delle Donne, Katie Ledecky, and Simone Biles. She also won Best Women's College Basketball Player at the 2016 ESPYs.

In 2017, Stewart continued to flourish after an impressive rookie season. She was voted into the 2017 WNBA All-Star Game, making it her first career all-star game appearance. On August 5, 2017, Stewart scored a season-high 32 points in an 87–80 overtime loss to the San Antonio Stars. Stewart would finish the season with a career-high of 19.9 points per game as the Storm finished with the number 8 seed in the league, but were once again a first-round exit as they were eliminated by the Phoenix Mercury.

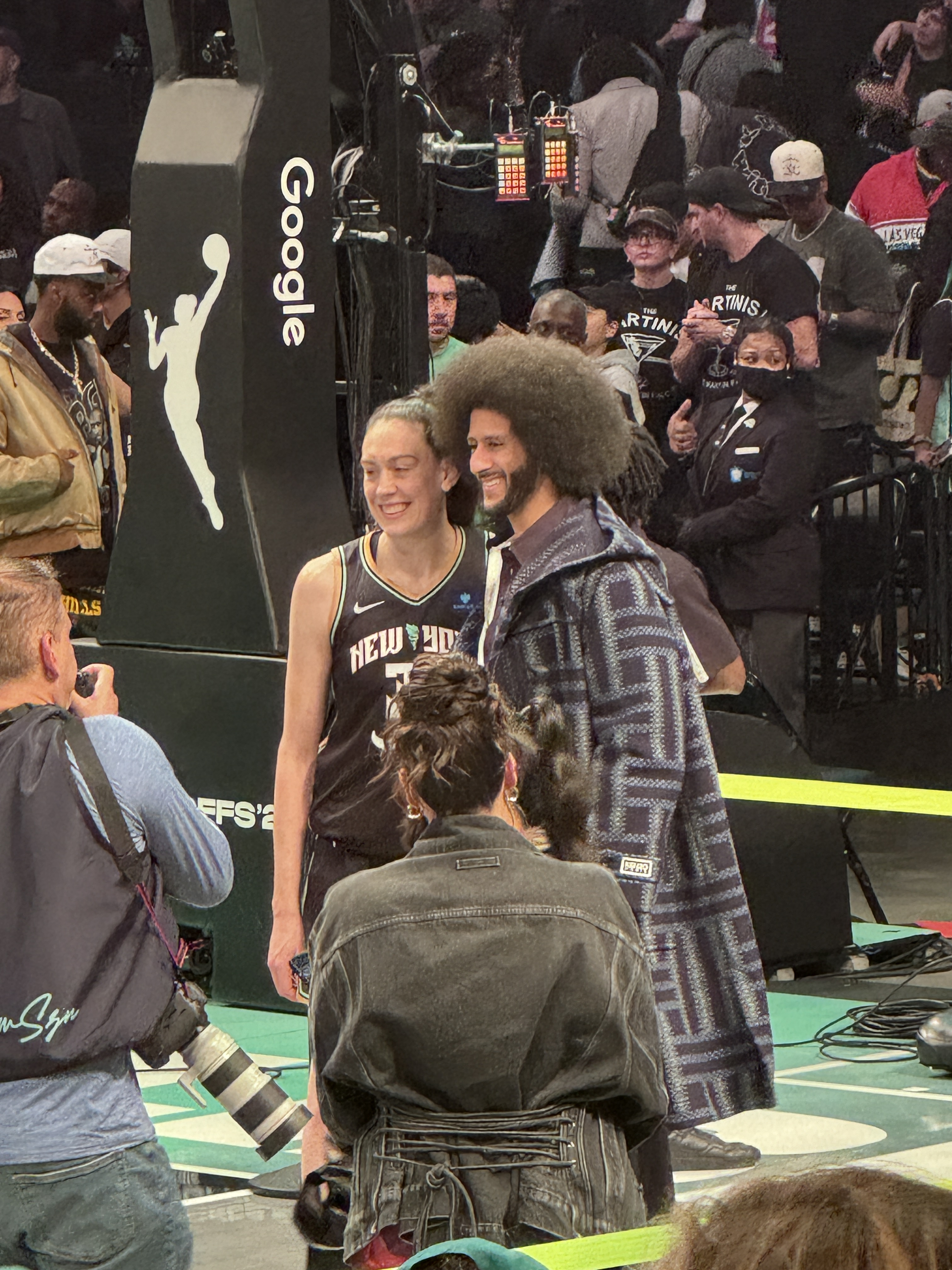
Breanna Stewart poses with the Activist and Former NFL Quarterback Colin Kaepernick after a WNBA Playoffs game at the Barclays Center on October 1, 2024

In 2018, Stewart would elevate her play to a superstar level. She was voted into the 2018 WNBA All-Star Game for her second all-star game appearance. On August 6, 2018, Stewart scored a season-high 32 points in a 96–80 victory over the New York Liberty, making it her fourth 30-point game of the season. By the end of the season, Stewart was ranked second in the league in scoring, she averaged new career-highs in scoring, steals, field goal percentage and three-point percentage. Stewart would also win the MVP award. This helped the Storm to a 26–8 record with the number 1 seed in the league, receiving a double-bye to the semi-finals. In the semi-finals, Stewart started off the series strong with a 28-point performance along with a career-high 6 three-pointers in a 91–87 victory against the Phoenix Mercury in Game 1. The Storm would end up winning the series in five games, advancing to the WNBA Finals for the first time since 2010. In the Finals, the Storm would defeat the Washington Mystics in a three-game sweep, winning their first championship in 8 years. Stewart averaged 25.7 points, 6.0 rebounds, 3.7 assists, 1.7 steals during the series. Stewart won Finals MVP, becoming the sixth player in league history to win both league MVP and Finals MVP in the same year.

On April 14, 2019, while playing for Russian club Dynamo Kursk in the 2019 EuroLeague Women final, Stewart suffered a torn Achilles tendon that caused her to miss the entire 2019 WNBA season. She returned to the U.S. the day after the injury and underwent surgery in Los Angeles later that week. Because the WNBA currently lacks any kind of inactive list, the Storm suspended Stewart in order to free up a roster spot. Shortly thereafter, the league made her a paid ambassador for the 2019 season, making her the first active player to fill such a role. Stewart earned slightly more in that role than she would have as a player. In July 2020, Stewart returned to playing, rejoining her teammates at the IMG Academy for training. She won her second title with the Storm in 2020 and was named the 2020 WNBA Finals MVP. In 2020 Sports Illustrated named her one of its Sportspeople of the Year for her activism off the court. During the WNBA's 25th season in 2021, Stewart was named to The W25 as one of the top 25 players in league history.

==== New York Liberty ====
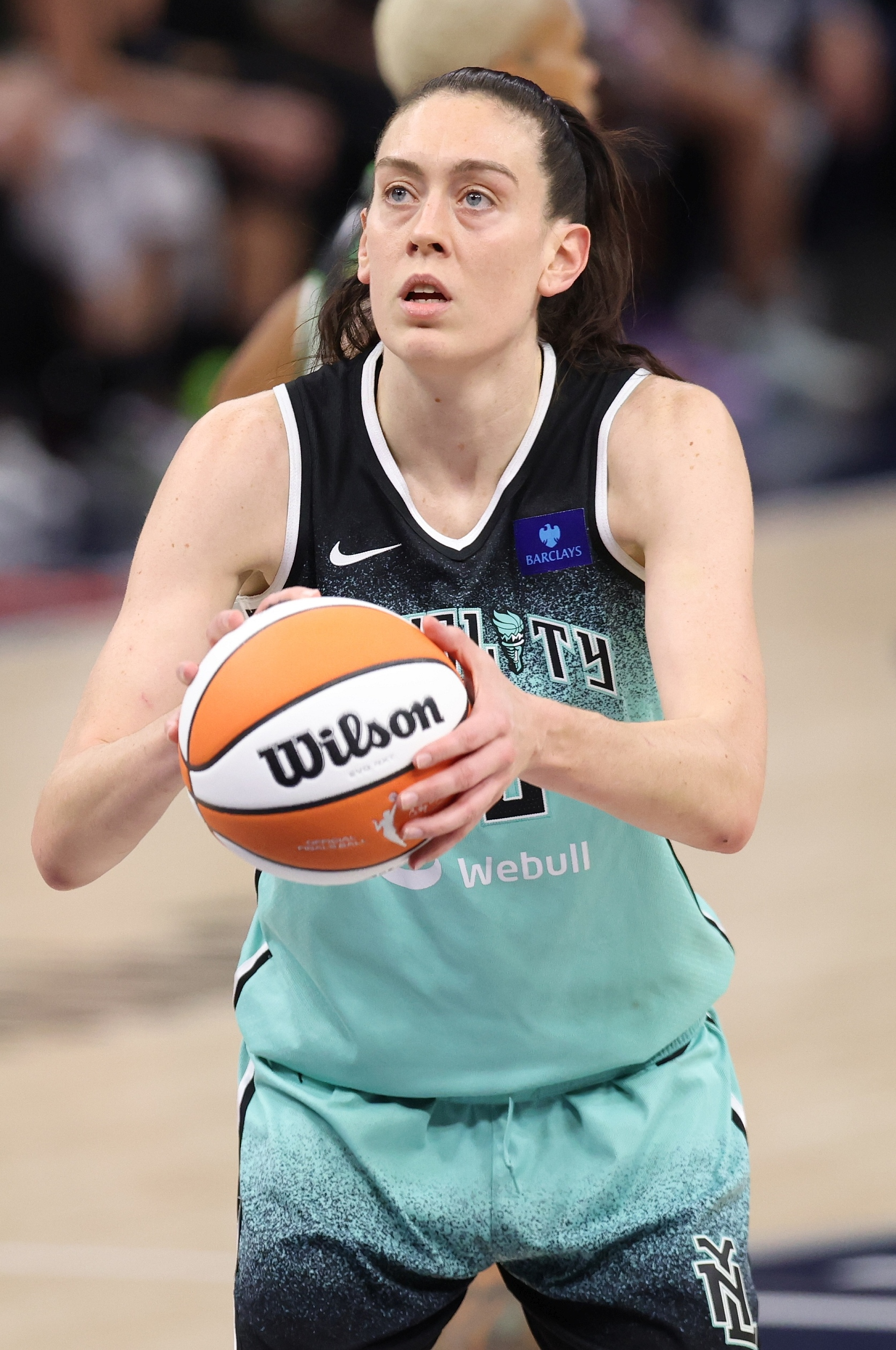
Stewart with the New York Liberty in 2024

On February 1, 2023, Stewart signed with the New York Liberty in free agency. In the debut home opener on May 21, 2023, against the Indiana Fever, Stewart scored 45 points and set a new franchise record for most points scored in a game by a single player, set a franchise record for most made field goals at 15, and set a career high in scoring as well as three-pointers made. In her first season with the Liberty, Stewart averaged 23 points, 9.3 rebounds, 3.8 assists, 1.57 blocked shots and 1.45 steals in 34.1 minutes in 40 games. MVP voters awarded Stewart as the 2023 Kia WNBA Most Valuable Player, making Stewart the eighth player in WNBA history to win the award more than once. The Liberty were the second seed heading into the 2023 WNBA playoffs and made it to the championship final round, falling short in game 4 to the Las Vegas Aces in a 70–69 loss. Stewart finished the 2023 postseason averaging 18.4 points, 10.2 rebounds, 3.1 assists, and 1.9 blocks over 10 games.

On October 20, 2024, the New York Liberty won its first-ever WNBA Championship in franchise history when it defeated the Minnesota Lynx in a 3-2 Finals series.

Stewart finished the 2024 postseason averaging 19.4 points, 9.5 rebounds, 3.6 assists and 1.9 blocks over 11 games. The Liberty's Finals victory made Stewart's third WNBA Championship.

=== Overseas ===
For her first full rookie season, Stewart signed with Shanghai Baoshan Dahua of the WCBA for the 2016–17 Chinese campaign. In 2017, Stewart re-signed with Shanghai for the 2017–18 WCBA season.

In June 2018, Stewart made a move to Europe and signed with Dynamo Kursk of the Russian Premier League. Here, she was named MVP of EuroLeague Women for the first time. In February 2020, Stewart returned to Russia to sign with UMMC Ekaterinburg for the remainder of the regular season. Re-signing there the following campaign, Stewart won her first EuroLeague championship with Ekat, as well as being named MVP of the 2021 Final Four with averages of 14.5 points, 7.0 rebounds and 3.0 assists per game in the season-ending tournament. She also claimed the Russian Premier League title.

She departed to sign with Fenerbahçe of Türkiye on 1 July 2022 for EuroLeague Women season. In Istanbul, Stewart landed the Turkish League title and was named Euroleague Final Four MVP for the second time as Fener landed the European championship, scoring 35 points in the final defeat of Mersin.

On February 16, 2026, Fenerbahçe announced that she rejoined the club for the remainder of the EuroLeague season.

=== Unrivaled ===
On July 9, 2024, Stewart was formally announced to play in the inaugural season of Unrivaled, a 3-on-3 basketball league founded by herself and Napheesa Collier in July 2023. She plays for the Mist. She scored the first basket in league history.

Mist won the 2026 championship. Stewart won MVP of the finals, recording 32 points, 3 rebounds, 5 assists, 2 steals, 2 blocks, and the game winning shot.

== National team career ==
=== U16 ===
Stewart was selected to join the USA Basketball U16 team, at age 14, the youngest member of the team; all other team members were 15 or 16. Initially, her parents turned down the invitation to join the team, worried about the amount of time she would be missing school. However, Mike Flynn, director of a prominent Amateur Athletic Union team, persuaded her parents that the invitation was an honor, so they relented. At the time, she stood six feet, three inches, the same height as Kiah Stokes and Elizabeth Williams. Despite being the youngest, she earned the starting role for all five games, scoring just under ten points per game, tying Elizabeth Williams for the team lead in blocks. Stewart helped the team win the gold medal in the First FIBA Americas U16 Championship for Women, held in Mexico City. The win secured an automatic bid to the 2010 FIBA U17 World Championship, held in Rodez and Toulouse, France.

=== U17 ===
Stewart continued with the USA team as it became the U17 team. The USA team won all eight games and the gold medal in the 2010 FIBA U17 World Championship for Women. Stewart earned a starting role in all eight games. In the first game, against the host team from France, she led all scorers with 13 points. In the final preliminary game against Japan, she led all scorers with 30 points. In the tournament, she averaged 12.8 points per game, second only to Elizabeth Williams at 13.5 points per game. Stewart was the team leader with 18 blocks.

=== U19 ===
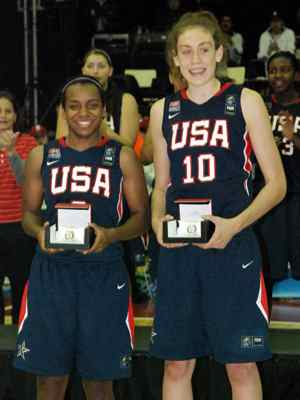
Ariel Massengale and Breanna Stewart, two of the five players named to the five-member All-FIBA U19 World Championship team

In 2011, Stewart was selected to be on the USA Basketball U19 team. The U18 team won the 2010 Americas Championship, thus earning an automatic bid to the U19 World Championship, held in Puerto Montt, Chile. The USA won their first five games, but then came up short, losing to Canada 64–52. They were still qualified for the medal round, and played against France in the quarter-final; the USA was down by 13 points early in the game, but took a lead with just over a minute to go in the game and won 70–64. The USA took an early lead in the semi-final against Brazil, and qualified for the gold medal game. The final was against Spain, which the USA won 69–46. Although she was one of the youngest players on the team, Stewart averaged 11.2 points per game to post the highest scoring average of the USA players. She was one of the five players named to the all tournament team; Ariel Massengale was the other USA player to earn all tournament honors.

=== 2011 Pan American Games ===
She competed for the United States at the 2011 Pan American Games. The USA Pan American team members were usually chosen from the college ranks, although many of the other countries use their national teams, which include professional players. Stewart was the only high school player chosen for the 2011 Pan American team, and only the second high school player in Pan American team history for the USA teams. The only other high school player on a Pan American team was Nancy Lieberman, who played on the 1975 team, almost 20 years before Stewart was born.

The 2011 team finished seventh, the first time in history they did not earn a medal, but Stewart, almost three years younger than the next youngest player, was still a major contributor, scoring 15.4 points per game to lead the team in scoring. She also led the team in blocks and rebounds.

Stewart was named the 2011 USA Basketball Female Athlete of the Year. USA Basketball cited her performance on the U19 team and the Pan American team. She was the second youngest on the U19 team, yet led the team in points, rebounds and blocks, helping to lead her team to a gold medal at the international competition, and earning a position on the all-tournament team. She occupies several spots in the U19 record books. She was named to the Pan American team, only the second high school player from the US to receive such a bid. Despite playing with college age players, she earned a starting position for all games, and again led the team in points, rebounds and blocks. The previous year's winner of the award was Diana Taurasi.

=== U18 ===
Stewart was named to the USA Basketball U-18 team. She joined future UConn teammates Moriah Jefferson and Morgan Tuck on the 12-player squad that competed in the 2012 FIBA Americas U-18 National Championship, held in August 2012, in Puerto Rico. Stewart was the youngest, and only high school player, on the 2011 USA Women's Pan American Games team, but was the player with the most international experience on the team. The team started by winning their first four games with margins of victory of 40 points or more. This set up the championship game against Brazil. The team from Brazil started strong, and held a double-digit lead early in the game. After scoring only seven points in the first quarter, the team scored 21 or more in the next three quarters and reclaimed the lead. The USA won 71–47 to claim the gold medal.

Stewart was awarded the MVP trophy as the best player in the FIBA Americas U18 competition.

=== 2013 U19 ===
Stewart, along with teammates Moriah Jefferson and Morgan Tuck, were three of the twelve players selected to be on the team representing the US at the U19 World Championship for Women held in Klaipėda and Panevėžys, Lithuania, in July 2013. Stewart was named the USA Basketball Female Athlete of the Year for the second time. Only five other players have won this award more than once, Teresa Edwards, Lisa Leslie, Cheryl Miller, Dawn Staley and Diana Taurasi, and none have accomplished this at so young an age. Stewart helped the US to a 9–0 record in the 2013 FIBA U19 World Championship, leading to a gold medal for the team and MVP honors for Stewart.

=== Senior national team ===
Stewart was one of 33 finalists for the U.S. Women's FIBA World Championship for Women Roster. She was the only collegiate player out of 32 WNBA women's basketball players to be selected by the USA Basketball Women's National Team Player Selection Committee to compete for the final roster to represent the US at the FIBA World Championship for Women in Turkey during September and October 2014. Stewart made the final roster of 12 players, announced on September 23, 2014. Stewart won the gold medal with the team in 2014.

Stewart was a member of the USA Pan American Team which participated in basketball at the 2015 Pan American Games held in Toronto, Ontario, Canada July 10 to 26, 2015. The USA won games against Brazil, the Dominican Republic, Puerto Rico, and Cuba, before losing the gold-medal game to the host team Canada.

==== Summer Olympics ====
USA Basketball named Stewart to the squad that played at the 2016 Summer Olympics in Rio de Janeiro. She won the gold medal with Team USA and joined Sheryl Swoopes, Cynthia Cooper-Dyke, Ruth Riley, Tamika Catchings and fellow UConn alums Kara Wolters, Swin Cash, Sue Bird, Diana Taurasi, and Maya Moore, as female basketball players who have won NCAA titles, WNBA Championships, and Olympic gold medals.

She again won gold at the 2020 Summer Olympics in Tokyo where she averaged 15 points and 10 rebounds per game and was named the Olympic Tournament's Most Valuable Player and to the FIBA's All-Star Five team.

In June 2024, Stewart was named to her third US Olympic team to compete at the 2024 Summer Olympics in France, alongside fellow Liberty teammate, Sabrina Ionescu. Stewart and the United States defeated France 67–66 in the final, earning her third consecutive gold medal and the United States' eighth consecutive gold medal. At the end of the Olympic tournament, she was again named to FIBA's All-Star Five team.

==== 2026 FIBA Women's Basketball World Cup ====
- TISSOT MVP of the competition
- All Star 5

== Off the court ==
=== Personal life ===
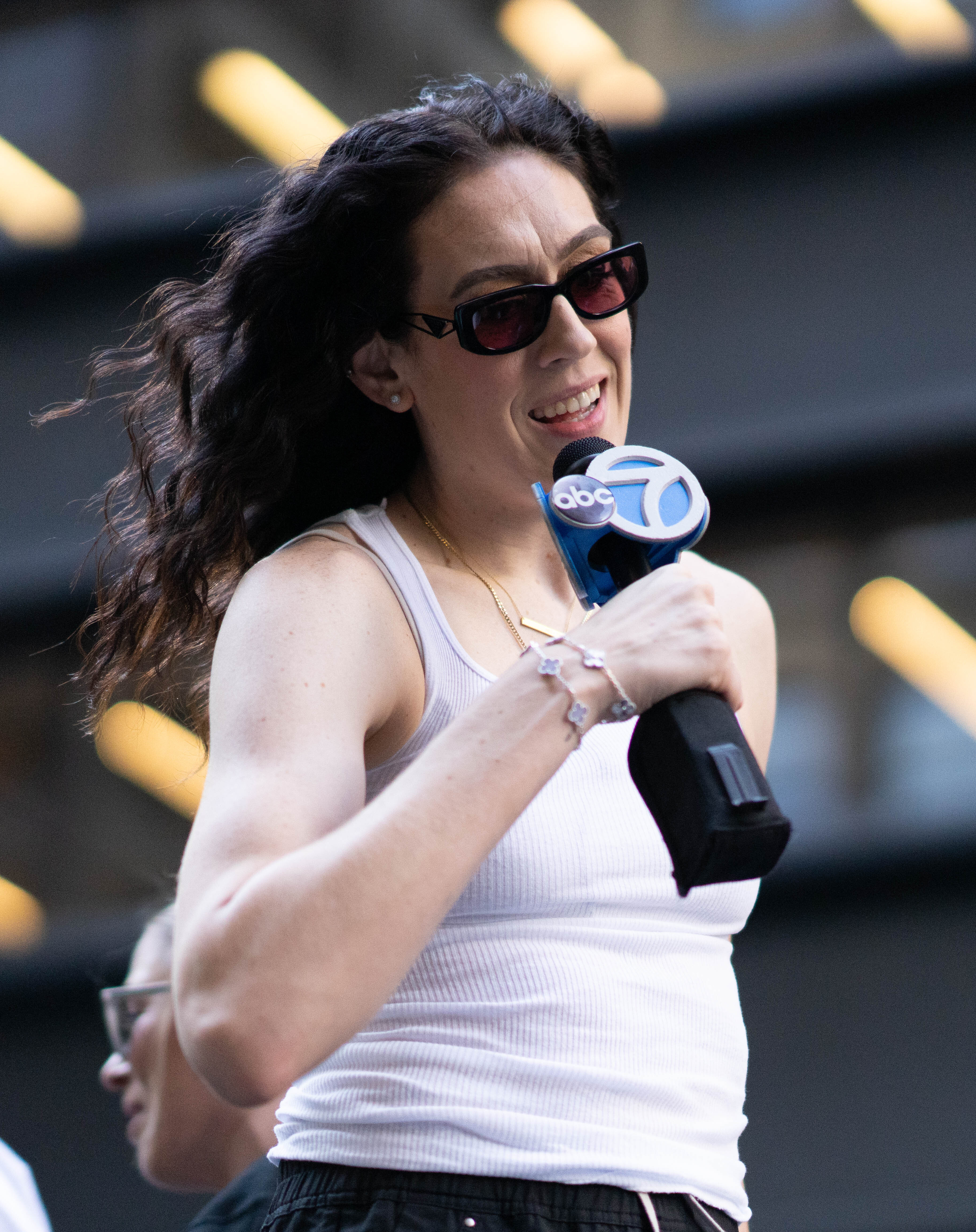
Stewart being interviewed at the New York Liberty championship parade in 2024

In 2018, Stewart posed nude for ESPN's The Body Issue magazine.

Stewart is a lesbian and is married to former WNBA and EuroLeague Spanish professional basketball player Marta Xargay Casademont. The couple started dating while teammates at Dynamo Kursk. Stewart proposed in May 2021, and they were married on July 6, 2021.

In August 2021, about 48 hours after Stewart won an Olympic gold medal in Tokyo, their first child, Ruby Mae Stewart-Xargay, was born via surrogacy. In May 2023, the couple announced via Instagram that Xargay Casademont was pregnant with their second child. In October 2023, the couple's second child, Theo Josep Stewart Xargay, was born.

=== Business interests ===
In 2016, Stewart signed a multi-year endorsement deal with Nike.

In 2021, she signed a multi-year sponsorship with Puma. In September 2022 she released the company's first female signature shoes in over a decade, called Stewie 1 Quiet Fire.

In July 2023, Stewart and Napheesa Collier founded a new professional women's 3-on-3 basketball league, Unrivaled, in part to allow WNBA players to play domestically and to bypass complications from the WNBA's prioritization rule for players who choose to play overseas in the WNBA offseason. Unrivaled's inaugural season began in January 2025 in Miami, Florida. In July 2024, when Ally Financial was announced as Unrivaled's first and founding brand partner, Stewart also signed with and joined Team Ally as an athlete. In 2025, she was selected to the Time 100 list, honoring the 100 most influential people in the world, for her work with Unrivaled.

== Career statistics ==
Legend
GP	Games played	GS	Games started	MPG	Minutes per game	RPG	Rebounds per game
APG	Assists per game	SPG	Steals per game	BPG	Blocks per game	PPG	Points per game
TO	Turnovers per game	FG%	Field-goal percentage	3P%	3-point field-goal percentage	FT%	Free-throw percentage
**Bold**	Career best	°	League leader

†	Denotes seasons in which Stewart won a WNBA championship
*	Denotes seasons in which Stewart won an NCAA championship

=== WNBA ===
==== Regular season ====
WNBA regular season statistics
Year	Team	GP	GS	MPG	FG%	3P%	FT%	RPG	APG	SPG	BPG	TO	PPG
2016	Seattle	34	34	**34.7**	.457	.338	.833	9.3	3.4	1.2	**1.8**	2.3	18.3
2017	Seattle	33	33	32.9	.475	.371	.787	8.7	2.7	1.1	1.6	2.4	19.9
2018^{†}	Seattle	34	34	31.6	**.529**	**.415**	.820	8.4	2.5	1.4	1.4	1.8	21.8
2019	Seattle	Did not play due to injury											
2020^{†}	Seattle	20	20	30.4	.451	.368	.**894**	8.3	3.6	**1.7**	1.3	2.5	19.7
2021	Seattle	28	28	33.4	.439	.336	.847	**9.6**	2.7	1.2	1.7	1.6	20.3
2022	Seattle	34	34	30.9	.472	.379	.837	7.6	2.9	1.6	.9	**1.3**	21.8
2023	New York	40	40	34.1	.465	.355	.851	9.3	**3.8**	1.5	1.6	1.5	**23.0**
2024^{†}	New York	38	38	32.7	.458	.295	.845	8.5	3.5	**1.7**	1.3	1.7	20.4
2025	New York	31	31	30.6	.461	.241	.837	6.5	3.5	1.4	1.4	1.9	18.3
2026	New York	**42**	**42**	33.0	.474	.254	.841	8.3	3.3	1.4	1.3	2.0	20.8
**Career**	10 years, 2 teams	334	334	32.6	.469	.341	.837	8.5	3.2	1.4	1.4	1.9	20.5
**Career**	All-Star	8	7	24.3	.500	.250	.846	6.8	4.4	.4	.5	.6	12.8

==== Playoffs ====
WNBA playoff statistics
Year	Team	GP	GS	MPG	FG%	3P%	FT%	RPG	APG	SPG	BPG	TO	PPG
2016	Seattle	1	1	38.0	**.600**	.500	**1.000**	7.0	3.0	**2.0**	.0	**.0**	19.0
2017	Seattle	1	1	36.2	.353	.500	.818	8.0	1.0	1.0	2.0	3.0	23.0
2018^{†}	Seattle	8	8	37.1	.466	.416	.823	6.8	2.5	1.2	.8	2.3	24.6
2020^{†}	Seattle	6	6	32.5	.538	.500	.852	7.8	4.0	1.7	1.7	1.2	25.7
2022	Seattle	6	6	38.8	.513	**.520**	.892	9.5	4.2	1.0	1.8	2.0	**27.0**
2023	New York	10	10	38.0	.358	.196	.872	**10.2**	3.1	1.1	1.9	2.1	18.4
2024^{†}	New York	**11**	**11**	37.4	.382	.261	.817	9.4	3.6	1.6	1.7	2.4	19.4
2025	New York	3	3	31.7	.459	.429	.773	5.7	3.0	1.3	1.0	1.3	18.0
2026	New York	5	5	**40.0**	.482	.353	.925	6.8	**5.0**	1.8	**2.2**	2.2	**27.0**
**Career**	9 years, 2 teams	51	51	37.0	.440	.359	.857	8.5	3.5	1.4	1.6	2.0	22.4

=== International ===
==== EuroLeague ====
†	Denotes seasons in which Stewart won a EuroLeague championship

EuroLeague statistics
Year	Team	GP	GS	MPG	FG%	3P%	FT%	RPG	APG	SPG	BPG	TO	PPG	PIR
2018–19	(Russia) Dynamo Kursk	**18**	**18**	**35.0**	.459	.400	.771	7.9	**2.8**	1.1	**1.4**	2.3	21.0°	21.9
2019–20	(Russia) UMMC Ekaterinburg	2	1	25.4	.471	.000	.571	5.5	2.5	.5	.4	**1.0**	10.0	13.5
2020–21^{†}	(Russia) UMMC Ekaterinburg	10	9	30.3	.470	.344	**.947**	6.1	2.6	1.2	1.1	2.3	12.3	15.6
2022–23^{†}	(Turkey) Fenerbahçe	11	11	31.0	**.491**	**.444**	.881	**8.0**	2.2	**1.8**	1.0	1.1	**21.7**	**25.4**
2025–26^{†}	(Turkey) Fenerbahçe	2	2	25.2	.267	.400	.500	3.5	.0	.5	1.0	2.5	6.0	2.0
Career		43	41	32.0	.465	.397	.813	7.2	2.4	1.3	1.2	1.9	18.0	20.0

=== College ===
NCAA statistics
Year	Team	GP	Points	FG%	3P%	FT%	RPG	APG	SPG	BPG	PPG
2012–13*	UConn	36	497	.508	.333	.777	6.4	1.0	1.1	2.1	13.8
2013–14*	UConn	**40**	**777**	.497	.343	.774	8.1	3.1	1.6	2.8	**19.4**
2014–15*	UConn	39	686	.539	.313	.805	7.8	3.1	1.6	2.7	17.6
2015–16*	UConn	37	716	**.579**	**.426**	**.836**	**8.7**	**4.0**	**1.8**	**3.4**	**19.4**
**Career**		152	2,676	.530	.355	.797	7.8	2.8	1.5	2.7	17.6

== Awards and honors ==
=== WNBA ===
- 3x WNBA Champion: 2018, 2020, 2024
- 2x WNBA Finals MVP: 2018, 2020
- 2x WNBA MVP: 2018, 2023
- WNBA All-Star: 2017, 2018, 2021, 2022, 2023
- All-WNBA First Team: 2018, 2020, 2021
- All-WNBA Second Team: 2016
- WNBA All-Defensive Second Team: 2016
- WNBA Rookie of the Year Award: 2016
- 3x Commissioner's Cup Champion: 2021, 2023, 2026
- Commissioner's Cup MVP: 2021, 2026
- The W25 (Top 25 Players in League History) (2021)
- Sports Illustrated Sportsperson of the Year (2020)
- ESPY Award for Best Female Athlete and Best Female College Player (2016)

=== USA Basketball ===
- 3× Olympic Gold Medalist (2016, 2020, 2024)
- 4× FIBA Women's World Cup Champion (2014, 2018, 2022, 2026)
- 2× FIBA Women's World Cup MVP (2018, 2026)
- FIBA Under-19 Women's World Cup MVP (2013)
- USA Basketball Female Athlete of the Year (2011, 2013, 2018)
- ALL-STAR FIVE of Paris Olympics 2024 Women's Basketball

=== International ===
- EuroLeague Women champion (2021, 2023)
- EuroLeague Women Regular Season MVP (2019)
- EuroLeague Women Final Four MVP (2021, 2023)
- All-EuroLeague First Team (2023)
- Russian Premier League champion (2021)
- Russian Super Cup champion (2021)
- Turkish Super League champion (2023)

=== College ===
- 4x NCAA basketball tournament Most Outstanding Player (2013, 2014, 2015, 2016)(making her the first person to be most outstanding player of the Final Four four times)
- 3× Naismith College Player of the Year (2014, 2015, 2016)
- 3× USBWA Women's National Player of the Year (2014, 2015, 2016)
- 3× Associated Press Women's College Basketball Player of the Year (2014, 2015, 2016)(making her the first female college basketball player to win that award three times)
- 3× American Athletic Conference Women's Basketball Player of the Year (2014, 2015, 2016)
- 2x Wade Trophy (2015, 2016)
- 2x John R. Wooden Award (2015, 2016)
- Senior CLASS Award (2016)
- 3x Honda Sports Award, basketball (2014,2015,2016)
- Honda-Broderick Cup and named Collegiate Woman Athlete of the Year(2016)
- James E. Sullivan Award, basketball (2015)
- Ann Meyers Drysdale Award (2014)

=== High school ===
- Naismith Prep Player of the Year (2012)
- USA Today Player of the Year (2012)
- Gatorade Female Basketball Player of the Year (2012)
- Gatorade Female Athlete of the Year (2012)
- McDonald's All-American (2012)
- Gatorade New York Girls Basketball Player of the Year (2011)
- USA Basketball Female Athlete of the Year (2011)
- ESPN Rise All-America second team (2010)
- Parade All-America fourth team (2010)

== See also ==
- List of WNBA career blocks leaders
- List of WNBA career free throw scoring leaders
- List of WNBA career rebounding leaders
- List of WNBA career scoring leaders
