= American Conference Women's Basketball Player of the Year =

- Awarded for: the most outstanding basketball player in the American Conference
- Country: United States
- First award: 2014
- Currently held by: Victoria Flores, Rice

The American Conference Women's Basketball Player of the Year is a basketball award given to the American Conference's most outstanding player, as chosen by the league's head coaches. The conference formed in 2013–14 after many schools departed from the original Big East Conference to form a new Big East Conference. The conference was called the American Athletic Conference from its inception up until July 21, 2025, at which time it was formally rebranded.

The first seven awards were claimed by players from UConn, which left after the 2019–20 season to join the current Big East, having won every conference game in both regular-season and tournament play during its American tenure. Breanna Stewart won the first three awards in 2014, 2015, and 2016. The following season saw the first-ever shared award, with Napheesa Collier and Katie Lou Samuelson sharing honors. Each would win the award once more as an individual.

== Key ==
†	Co-Players of the Year
*	Awarded a national player of the year award that same season: Wade Trophy (1977–78 to present); Naismith College Player of the Year (1982–83 to present); John R. Wooden Award (2003–04 to present)
Player (X)	Denotes the number of times the player had been awarded the AAC Player of the Year award at that point

== Winners ==
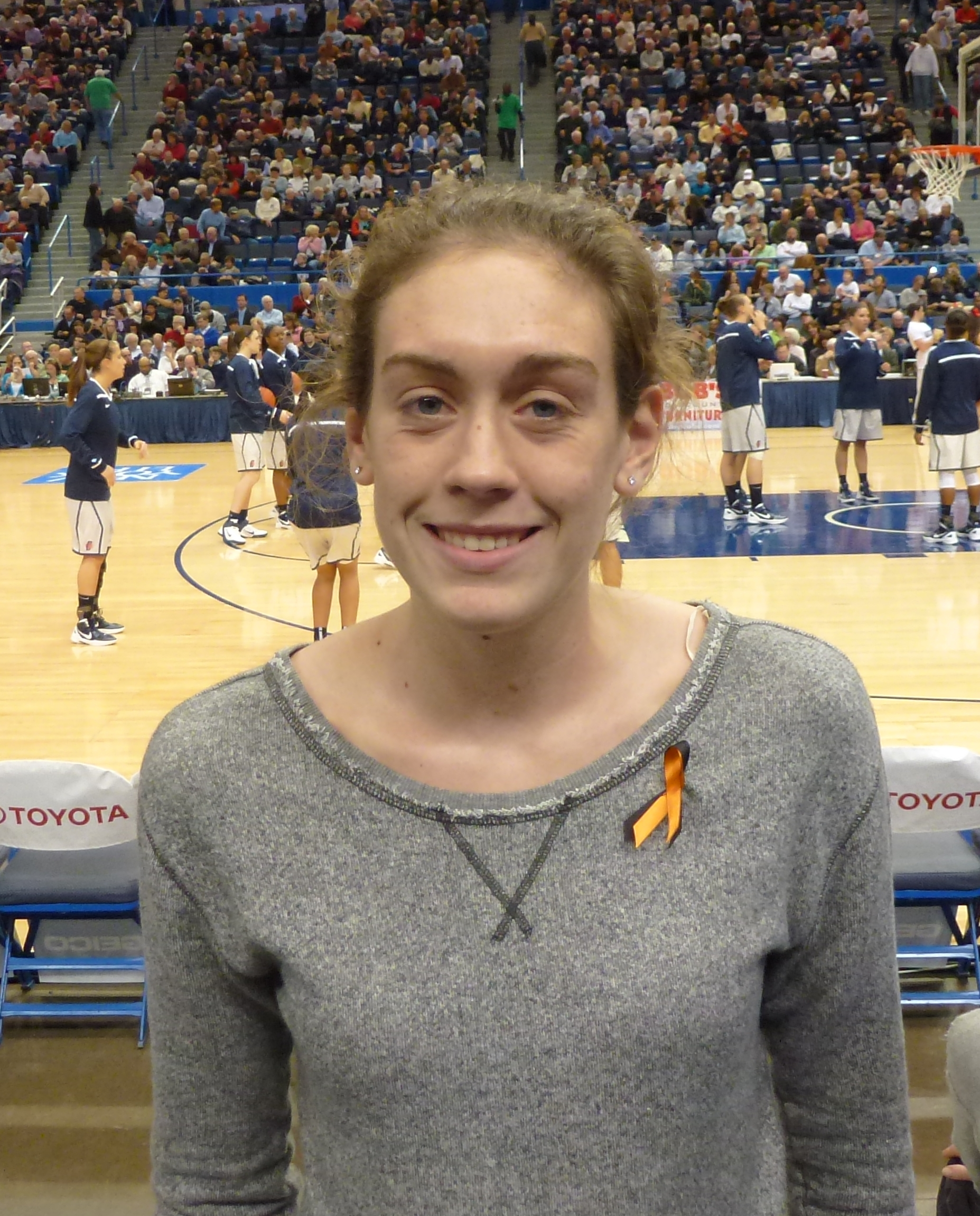
Breanna Stewart, recipient of the first three AAC Player of the Year awards (2014–2016).

Season	Player	School	Position	Class	Reference
2013–14	Breanna Stewart*	UConn	F	Sophomore	
2014–15	Breanna Stewart* (2)	UConn	F	Junior	
2015–16	Breanna Stewart* (3)	UConn	F	Senior	
2016–17^{†}	Napheesa Collier	UConn	F	Sophomore	
2016–17^{†}	Katie Lou Samuelson	UConn	G/F	Sophomore	
2017–18	Katie Lou Samuelson (2)	UConn	G/F	Junior	
2018–19	Napheesa Collier (2)	UConn	F	Senior	
2019–20	Megan Walker	UConn	F	Junior	
2020–21	IImar'I Thomas	Cincinnati	F	Senior	
2021–22	Diamond Battles	UCF	G	Senior	
2022–23^{†}	Dulcy Fankam Mendjiadeu	South Florida	F	Senior	
2022–23^{†}	Elena Tsineke	South Florida	G	Senior	
2023–24	Temira Poindexter	Tulsa	F	Junior	
2024–25	Jordyn Jenkins	UTSA	F	Senior	
2025–26	Victoria Flores	Rice	G	Junior	

== Winners by school ==
School (year joined)	Winners	Years
UConn (2013) (Note: UConn left The American after the 2019–20 season to join the current Big East Conference.)	8	2014, 2015, 2016, 2017 (x2)† (Note: In 2016–17 and 2022–23, two UConn and South Florida players shared the Player of the Year award. Both are counted in the total tally of Player of the Year Awards by school.), 2018, 2019, 2020
South Florida (2013)	2	2023 (x2) (Note: In 2016–17, two UConn players shared the Player of the Year award. Both are counted in the total tally of Player of the Year Awards by school.)
Cincinnati (2013) (Note: Cincinnati, Houston, and UCF left after the 2022–23 season for the Big 12 Conference.)	1	2021
Rice (2023)	1	2026
Tulsa (2014)	1	2024
UCF (2013)	1	2022
UTSA (2023)	1	2025
East Carolina (2014)	0	—
Houston (2013)	0	—
Louisville (2013) (Note: Louisville and Rutgers played only the 2013–14 season in The American. After that season, they respectively left for the ACC and Big Ten.)	0	—
Memphis (2013)	0	—
Rutgers (2013)	0	—
SMU (2013) (Note: SMU left for the Atlantic Coast Conference after the 2023–24 season.)	0	—
South Florida (2023)	0	—
Temple (2013)	0	—
Tulane (2014)	0	—
Wichita State (2017)	0	—
