= Unrivaled (basketball) =

Three-on-three basketball league

- Current season, competition or edition: 2027 Unrivaled season
- Sport: Basketball (three-on-three)
- Founded: July 6, 2023; 3 years ago
- Founder: Napheesa Collier; Breanna Stewart
- First season: 2025
- President: Alex Bazzell
- Commissioner: Micky Lawler
- No. of teams: 8
- Countries: United States
- Headquarters: Miami, Florida
- Most recent champion: Mist BC
- Most titles: Rose BC; Mist BC (1 title each)
- Broadcasters: United States: TNT Sports; HBO Max (streaming); Canada: TSN+; International: On YouTube (Unrivaled Basketball)
- Website: Unrivaled

Unrivaled is a women's three-on-three basketball league in the United States. The league was founded in 2023 and played its inaugural season in 2025.

== History ==
The league was co-founded in 2023 by basketball players Napheesa Collier and Breanna Stewart, in part to allow Women's National Basketball Association (WNBA) players to play domestically and to bypass complications from the WNBA's prioritization rule for players who choose to play overseas in the WNBA offseason. Players would be paid a salary and receive equity in the league. Early investors in Unrivaled included former ESPN president John Skipper and the former president of Turner Broadcasting, David Levy, who would both also lead the league's media rights and sponsorship sales. In May 2024, Unrivaled announced it had closed its seed funding. By January 2025, the league had over $35 million in funding. Players announced to be joining Unrivaled included Stewart and Collier, as well as Aliyah Boston, Chelsea Gray, Brittney Griner, Rhyne Howard, Sabrina Ionescu, Jewell Loyd, Arike Ogunbowale, Angel Reese, and Jackie Young. Coaches joining the league's first season, and their prospective teams, included:

- Phil Handy — Mist Basketball Club
- Adam Harrington — Phantom Basketball Club
- Nola Henry — Rose Basketball Club
- DJ Sackmann — Lunar Owls Basketball Club
- Andrew Wade — Laces Basketball Club
- Teresa Weatherspoon — Vinyl Basketball Club

Unrivaled's inaugural season began on January 17, 2025, in Medley, Florida, near Miami, with plans for the 2026 season to have games played across the U.S. The first season featured 36 players for six teams, and was played for eight weeks, with games on Mondays, Fridays, and Saturdays. On February 8, 2025, a game between Laces BC and Vinyl BC had to be cancelled because of a lack of available players due to injuries. The league's first one-on-one single-elimination tournament, which took place from February 10 to 14, 2025, was won by Collier. The league's first championship was won by Rose BC on March 17, 2025. In September 2025, Unrivaled announced two new teams, Hive BC and Breeze BC, bringing its total to eight teams.

Ahead of its second season, the league added 25% more seats to its Miami arena. It also added a fourth night of games and eliminated back-to-back game days. Games would be played on Fridays, Saturdays, Sundays, and Mondays, and air on TNT, truTV, and HBO Max.

The league's second season began on January 5, 2026, with a lineup of 54 players, including more than a dozen first-time players, such as Los Angeles Sparks guard Kelsey Plum, Indiana Fever guard Kelsey Mitchell, and Dallas Wings guard Paige Bueckers. As of 2026, more than three-quarters of Unrivaled's players were signed to multi-year deals.

Unrivaled had originally planned to expand in 2027, rather than in 2026, but president Alex Bazzell (who is married to Collier) said plans changed due to the league outperforming its financial projections.

On January 30, 2026, a league game in Philadelphia set a record for the highest attendance of any professional women's basketball regular-season game, with a total attendance of 21,490. In February 2026, it was announced that Unrivaled would be moving it semifinals to Barclays Center after making $2 million in revenue at the January game in Philadelphia. The league's second championship was won by Mist BC on March 4, 2026.

== Rules and regulations ==
Games are played on a full court with two ends, and consist of three seven-minute periods followed by a "winning score" fourth period played under Elam Ending conditions. (Note: This differs from FIBA 3x3 basketball competitions, which use a half-court and a single 10-minute period, with the possibility of overtime.) In Unrivaled's implementation, a "winning score" is determined by adding 11 points to the leading team's (or tied teams') score at the end of the third period. The game then continues with no game clock but with an active shot clock, and the first team to reach or exceed the "winning score" wins.

The court is a compressed full court billed as 72 feet long by 49.2 feet wide. The width is slightly less than that of courts in the WNBA, 49.2 feet versus 50 feet, while the length is noticeably shorter, 72 feet instead of 94 feet. It is slightly larger than courts used for 3x3 basketball competitions in the Olympics, which is a half court with a 36-foot by 49-foot surface area.

The shot clock in Unrivaled is shortened to 18 seconds for full possession (less than the WNBA's 24 seconds and college basketball's 30 seconds). The game clock only stops on baskets made in the final 30 seconds of a period.

Another change made in Unrivaled is to free throws resulting from personal fouls. Players are awarded one free throw after being fouled, with a successful free throw worth two points if fouled on a two-point shot or three points for a three-point shot. Free throws earned when fouled on a made basket are worth one point, as in the WNBA. Players will foul out after six personal fouls. However, if a team only has three remaining available players, no one will foul out. Instead, the player left on the court with six personal fouls will be given a technical foul and give the opposing team a one-point free throw opportunity.

== League format ==
The season includes nine weeks of total play, including playoffs. The teams play in a round-robin schedule. The top four teams in the standings at the conclusion of the regular season make the playoffs.

Unrivaled features a 1-on-1 single elimination tournament played in February to determine the best 1-on-1 player in the world. The winner of the tournament receives a $200,000 grand prize, the runner-up gets $50,000, and the last two semifinalists get $25,000. The first season's tournament saw Napheesa Collier beat Aaliyah Edwards. The second season's tournament saw Chelsea Gray defeat Allisha Gray.

== Teams ==
On October 24, 2024, the inaugural six team names were announced. Teams do not have geographic connections, although the branding was created with a consideration for potential future sale and relocation of the teams. The rosters for each team are decided by a selection committee that sorts players based on their position and skill level. Each team has a head coach, an assistant coach, and a team manager. Ahead of the 2026 season, the league added a dedicated athletic trainer and a player development coach to each team.

For the 2026 season, the inaugural six clubs returned with the addition of two new clubs, Breeze BC and Hive BC, and a formal player development pool. Adding two teams opened up 12 new roster spots.

=== Teams and head coaches ===
Overview of Unrivaled teams – 2026 season
Team	Joined	Current head coach
Breeze BC	2026	Noelle Quinn
Hive BC	2026	Rena Wakama
Laces BC	2025	Andrew Wade
Lunar Owls BC	2025	DJ Sackmann
Mist BC	2025	Zach O'Brien
Phantom BC	2025	Roneeka Hodges
Rose BC	2025	Nola Henry
Vinyl BC	2025	Teresa Weatherspoon

== Business ==
=== Finances and sponsorships ===
In May 2024, it was announced that John Skipper, a former ESPN president, and David Levy, a former Turner president, had invested in Unrivaled and would be at the helm of the league's media rights and sponsorship sales. Other notable early investors include Koby Altman, Carmelo Anthony, Geno Auriemma, Moira Forbes, Desiree Gruber, Tre Jones, Tyus Jones, Ashton Kutcher, Alex Morgan, Steve Nash, Megan Rapinoe, Richard and Ann Sarnoff, Dan Rosensweig, Gary Vaynerchuk, and Michelle Wie West. Also in May 2024, Unrivaled announced it had closed its seed funding. In December 2024, the league announced that its Series A round had closed with a new total capital of $35 million and included new investors such as Dawn Staley, JuJu Watkins, Michael and Nicole Phelps, Rip Hamilton, and Giannis Antetokounmpo. In January 2025, Coco Gauff also announced her investment in Unrivaled. At the end of Unrivaled's inaugural regular season, the league announced that NBA All-Star Stephen Curry had also joined as an investor.

In July 2024, Ally Financial was announced as Unrivaled's first and founding brand partner. In December 2024, Under Armour was announced as the league's "official uniform partner and performance outfitter." Under Armour would provide performance apparel and accessories and also provide players without conflicting brand deals access to their footwear line and opportunity to create custom merchandise.

Unrivaled partners and sponsors
Company	Joined	Role	Ref.
Ally Financial	July 2024	Founding brand partner and jersey sponsor	
TNT Sports	October 2024	Exclusive media rights partner	
Mediapro North America	November 2024	Production and hosting partner	
State Farm	November 2024	Presenting sponsor for 2025 Club Selection Show; Home and auto insurance partner	
Wilson Sporting Goods	December 2024	Official ball manufacturer	
Under Armour	December 2024	Uniform partner and performance outfitter	
Ticketmaster	December 2024	Official ticketing partner	
Miller Lite	December 2024	Official beer partner	
Vistaprint	January 2025	Official print and design partner	
Sephora	January 2025	Official beauty partner	
Samsung Galaxy	January 2025	Official technology and presenting partner	
IcyHot	January 2025	Official recovery partner	
Sprite	January 2025	Presenting partner of 2025 1v1 Tournament	
BODYARMOR	January 2025	Official sports drink	
Wayfair	January 2025	Official home furnishing partner Namesake of Unrivaled 2025 Arena	
Opill	January 2025		
Morgan Stanley	January 2025	Official wealth and asset management partner	
Mount Sinai Medical Center	January 2025	Official medical provider	
Therabody	January 2025		

=== Player salaries, revenue, and amenities ===
Unrivaled offers players in the league contract opportunities to receive the highest average salary in U.S. women's professional sports, and a minimum six-figure salary. In December 2024, the president of Unrivaled, Alex Bazzell, announced that the league's total salary pool for the 2025 season was $8 million. (Note: making the average salary per player around $222,222) The winner of the 2025 1-on-1 mid-season tournament would earn a minimum of $250,000.

To create an athlete-centric and player-owned league, Unrivaled offered the inaugural players equity in the league for at least the first year, with an "equity pool that will vest over a four-year period."

For the 2025 season, players lived in a Miami apartment building (about five minutes away from the main facility) with access to gym and practice facilities, paid for by the league.

=== Name, image, likeness ===
In August 2024, it was announced that Paige Bueckers had signed a name, image, and likeness (NIL) deal with Unrivaled, with plans for Bueckers to make her Unrivaled debut in the 2026 season. (Note: At the time of signing, Bueckers had two more years of NCAA eligibility. She was expected to end her college career after the 2024–25 season and make her Unrivaled debut after the 2025 WNBA season.) On April 13, 2025, the day before Bueckers was the first overall pick in the WNBA draft, she signed a three-year deal to play in Unrivaled, with the first year of her contract reportedly paying her more than her entire four-year WNBA rookie contract. In December 2024, Unrivaled announced that Flau'jae Johnson had also signed a similar deal with the league.

On July 21, 2025, Unrivaled announced the signing of 14 of the best college basketball players to NIL deals as part of "The Future is Unrivaled Class of 2025". The group included Lauren Betts, Sienna Betts, Madison Booker, Audi Crooks, Azzi Fudd, MiLaysia Fulwiley, Hannah Hidalgo, Flau’jae Johnson, Ta'Niya Latson, Olivia Miles, Kiki Rice, Sarah Strong, Syla Swords, and JuJu Watkins.

=== Unrivaled leadership ===
Alex Bazzell, a renowned basketball skills coach and Collier's husband, was the first president of Unrivaled. In June 2024, Micky Lawler, a former Women's Tennis Association president, was named the commissioner of the league. In November 2024, Clare Duwelius (former general manager of the Minnesota Lynx) was announced as executive vice president and general manager of the league. Luke Cooper is the president of basketball operations.

== Broadcasting ==
The 2025 season aired on TNT and TruTV, and streamed on HBO Max in the U.S.
