= List of WNBA head coaches =

This is an all-time list of Women's National Basketball Association (WNBA) head coaches.

== Coaches ==
GC	Games coached
W	Wins
L	Losses
W–L %	Win–Loss percentage

Note: Coaching records are correct as of 9/21/2025 games.

Coach	Team(s)	Year(s)	Reg. season GC	Reg. season W	Reg. season L	Reg. season W–L%	Playoff GC	Playoff W	Playoff L	Playoff W–L%	Titles
Michael Adams	Washington	2004	34	17	17	.500	3	1	2	.250	
Richie Adubato	New York; Washington	1999–2004; 2005–2007	250	134	116	.536	29	14	15	.483	
Brian Agler	Minnesota; Seattle; Los Angeles; Dallas	1999–2002; 2008–2014; 2015–2018; 2019–2020	545	287	258	.527	43	24	19	.558	2 ('10, '16)
Sonny Allen	Sacramento	1998–2001	76	46	30	.605	3	0	3	–	
Henry Bibby	Los Angeles	2005	29	13	16	.448	0	0	0	–	
Nikki Blue	Phoenix	2023	28	7	21	.250	0	0	0	–	
Muggsy Bogues	Charlotte	2005–2006	44	14	30	.318	0	0	0	–	
Jenny Boucek	Sacramento; Seattle	2007–2009; 2015–2017	175	76	99	.434	7	2	5	.286	
Sandy Brondello	San Antonio; Phoenix; New York; Toronto	2010; 2014–2021; 2022–2025; 2026–present	450	269	181	.598	72	40	32	.556	2 ('14, '24)
Dee Brown	Orlando; San Antonio	2002; 2004	56	22	34	.393	0	0	0	–	
Joe Bryant	Los Angeles	2005–2006; 2011	63	40	23	.635	7	2	5	.286	
Van Chancellor	Houston	1997–2006	322	211	111	.655	34	20	14	.588	4 ('97-'00)
Pokey Chatman	Chicago; Indiana	2011–2016; 2017–2019	306	134	172	.438	20	7	12	.368	
Nicki Collen	Atlanta	2018–2020	90	38	52	.422	5	2	3	.400	
Cynthia Cooper	Phoenix	2001–2002	42	19	23	.452	0	0	0	–	
Michael Cooper	Los Angeles; Los Angeles; Atlanta	2000–2004; 2007–2009; 2014–2017	388	230	158	.593	43	27	16	.628	2 ('01-'02)
Dave Cowens	Chicago	2006	34	5	29	.147	0	0	0	–	
Pat Coyle	New York	2004–2009	171	81	90	.474	16	6	10	.375	
Shell Dailey	San Antonio	2003; 2004	22	9	13	.409	0	0	0	–	
Nancy Darsch	New York; Washington	1997–1998; 1999–2000	110	56	54	.509	2	1	1	.500	
Anne Donovan	Indiana; Charlotte; Seattle; New York; Connecticut	2000; 2001–2002; 2003–2007; 2009–2010; 2013–2015	419	205	214	.489	31	14	17	.452	1 ('04)
Lin Dunn	Seattle; Indiana	2000–2002; 2008–2014	334	168	166	.503	43	23	20	.535	1 ('12)
T. R. Dunn	Charlotte	2000	32	8	24	.250	0	0	0	–	
Teresa Edwards	Tulsa	2011	23	2	21	.087	0	0	0	–	
Derek Fisher	Los Angeles	2019–2022	100	54	46	.540	5	1	4	.200	
Nell Fortner	Indiana	2001–2003	98	42	56	.429	3	1	2	.333	
Corey Gaines	Phoenix	2008–2013	191	90	101	.471	20	11	9	.550	1 ('09)
Jennifer Gillom	Minnesota; Los Angeles	2009; 2010–2011	78	31	47	.397	2	0	2	.000	
Carrie Graf	Phoenix	2004–2005	68	33	35	.485	0	0	0	–	
Becky Hammon	Las Vegas	2022–present	160	117	43	.731	37	28	9	.757	3 (22', '23, '25)
Linda Hargrove	Portland	2000–2002	96	37	59	.385	0	0	0	–	
Candi Harvey	Utah; San Antonio	2001–2002; 2003	73	40	33	.548	7	2	5	.286	
Linda Hill-MacDonald	Cleveland	1997–1999	90	42	48	.467	3	1	2	.333	
Walt Hopkins	New York	2020–2021	22	14	40	.259	1	0	1	.000	
Dan Hughes	Charlotte; Cleveland; San Antonio; San Antonio; Seattle; Seattle	1999; 2000–2003; 2005–2009; 2011–2016; 2018–2019; 2021	598	286	312	.478	50	22	28	.440	1 ('18)
Carolyn Jenkins	Minnesota	2006	11	2	9	.182	0	0	0	–	
Sydney Johnson	Washington	2024–present	44	16	28	.364	0	0	0	–	
Vickie Johnson	San Antonio; Dallas	2017; 2021–2022	102	40	62	.392	4	1	3	.250	
Jessie Kenlaw	Washington	2008	12	2	10	.167	0	0	0	–	
Steven Key	Chicago	2008–2010	102	42	60	.412	0	0	0	–	
Gary Kloppenburg	Tulsa; Seattle; Seattle	2012–2013; 2017; 2020	98	43	55	.439	7	6	1	.857	1 ('20)
Carlos Knox	Indiana	2022	27	3	24	.111	0	0	0	–	
Chris Koclanes	Dallas	2025	44	10	34	.227	0	0	0	–	
Trudi Lacey	Charlotte; Washington	2003–2006; 2011–2012	160	48	112	.300	2	0	2	.000	
Bill Laimbeer	Detroit; New York; New York; Las Vegas	2002–2009; 2013–2017; 2018–2021	521	306	215	.587	68	37	31	.544	3 ('03, '06, '08)
Frank Layden	Utah	1998–1999	15	4	11	.267	0	0	0	–	
Jim Lewis	Washington	1998	18	2	16	.111	0	0	0	–	
Nancy Lieberman	Detroit	1998–2000	94	46	48	.489	1	0	1	.000	
Tom Maher	Washington	2001	32	10	22	.313	0	0	0	–	
Rick Mahorn	Detroit	2009	30	17	13	.567	5	3	2	.600	
Tyler Marsh	Chicago	2024–present	44	10	34	.227	0	0	0	–	
Suzie McConnell-Serio	Minnesota	2003–2006	125	58	67	.464	5	1	4	.200	
Maura McHugh	Sacramento	2001–2003	70	35	35	.500	5	3	2	.600	
Taj McWilliams-Franklin	Dallas	2018	3	1	2	.333	1	0	1	.000	
Marynell Meadors	Charlotte; Atlanta	1997–1999; 2008–2012	230	111	119	.483	20	8	12	.400	
Rachid Meziane	Connecticut	2024–present	44	11	33	.250	0	0	0	–	
Cheryl Miller	Phoenix	1997–2000	122	70	52	.574	9	3	6	.333	
Curt Miller	Connecticut; Los Angeles	2016–2022; 2023–2024	262	161	141	.533	33	16	17	.485	
Mary Murphy	Sacramento	1997	15	5	10	.333	0	0	0	–	
Natalie Nakase	Golden State	2024–present	44	23	21	.523	2	0	2	.000	
Vanessa Nygaard	Phoenix	2022–2023	48	17	31	.354	2	0	2	.000	
Bo Overton	Chicago	2007	34	14	20	.412	0	0	0	–	
Cathy Parson	Washington	1998	12	1	11	.083	0	0	0	–	
Carolyn Peck	Orlando	1999–2001	96	44	52	.458	3	1	2	.333	
Russ Pennell	Phoenix	2013	13	9	4	.692	5	2	3	.400	
Mike Petersen	Atlanta	2021	19	6	13	.316	0	0	0	–	
Julie Plank	Washington	2009–2010	68	38	30	.559	4	0	4	.000	
Noelle Quinn	Seattle	2021–2025	186	97	89	.522	12	4	8	.333	
Cheryl Reeve	Minnesota	2010–present	554	364	190	.657	80	52	28	.650	4 ('11,'13,'15,'17)
Nolan Richardson	Tulsa	2010–2011	45	7	38	.156	0	0	0	–	
Lynne Roberts	Los Angeles	2024–present	44	21	23	.477	0	0	0	–	
Tree Rollins	Washington	2007–2008	52	24	28	.462	0	0	0	–	
Carol Ross	Los Angeles	2012–2014	90	58	32	.644	7	3	4	.429	
Ron Rothstein	Miami	2000–2002	96	48	48	.500	3	1	2	.333	
Julie Rousseau	Los Angeles	1997–1998	37	17	20	.459	0	0	0	–	
Alex Sarama	Portland	2026–present	0	0	0	–	0	0	0	–	
Christie Sides	Indiana	2023–2024	80	33	47	.413	2	0	2	.000	
Linda Sharp	Los Angeles; Phoenix	1997; 2002	33	9	24	.273	0	0	0	–	
John Shumate	Phoenix	2003	34	8	26	.235	0	0	0	–	
Karl Smesko	Atlanta	2024–present	44	30	14	.682	3	1	2	.333	
Katie Smith	New York	2018–2019	68	17	51	.250	0	0	0	–	
Marianne Stanley	Washington; Indiana	2002–2003; 2020–2022	129	40	89	.310	5	3	2	.600	
Amber Stocks	Chicago	2017–2018	68	25	43	.368	0	0	0	–	
Darius Taylor	Atlanta	2021	13	2	11	.154	0	0	0	–	
Denise Taylor	Utah	1997–1998	47	13	34	.277	0	0	0	–	
Karleen Thompson	Los Angeles; Houston	2004; 2007–2008	82	41	41	.500	3	1	2	.333	
Eric Thibault	Washington	2023–2024	80	33	47	.413	2	0	2	.000	
Mike Thibault	Connecticut; Washington	2003–2012; 2013–2022	668	379	289	.567	72	34	38	.472	1 ('19)
Nate Tibbetts	Phoenix	2023–present	84	46	38	.548	11	5	6	.455	
Penny Toler	Los Angeles	2014	12	6	6	.500	2	0	2	.000	
Latricia Trammell	Dallas	2023–2024	80	31	49	.388	5	2	3	.400	
Heidi VanDerveer	Sacramento; Minnesota	1997–1998; 2002	56	17	39	.304	0	0	0	–	
Emre Vatansever	Chicago	2023	24	11	13	.458	2	0	2	.000	
James Wade	Chicago	2019–2023	124	81	59	.579	21	13	8	.619	1 ('21)
Darrell Walker	Washington	2000	12	5	7	.417	2	0	2	.000	
Teresa Weatherspoon	Chicago	2023–2024	40	13	27	.325	0	0	0	–	
Paul Westhead	Phoenix	2006–2007	68	41	27	.603	9	7	2	.778	1 ('07)
John Whisenant	Sacramento; Sacramento; New York	2003–2006; 2009; 2011–2012	207	119	88	.575	34	20	14	.588	1 ('05)
Stephanie White	Indiana; Connecticut; Indiana	2015–2016; 2023–2024; 2024–present	192	116	76	.604	30	16	14	.533	
Fred Williams	Utah; Atlanta; Tulsa; Dallas; Los Angeles	1999–2001; 2012–2013; 2014–2015; 2016–2018; 2022	308	139	169	.451	14	5	9	.357	
Greg Williams	Detroit	2001–2002	42	10	32	.238	0	0	0	–	
Brian Winters	Indiana	2004–2007	136	78	58	.574	12	5	7	.417	
Orlando Woolridge	Los Angeles	1998–1999	42	25	17	.595	4	2	2	.500	
Tanisha Wright	Atlanta	2022–2024	116	48	68	.414	4	0	4	.000	
Don Zierden	Minnesota	2007–2009	68	26	42	.382	0	0	0	–	
