= Amber Jacobs =

American basketball player (born 1982)

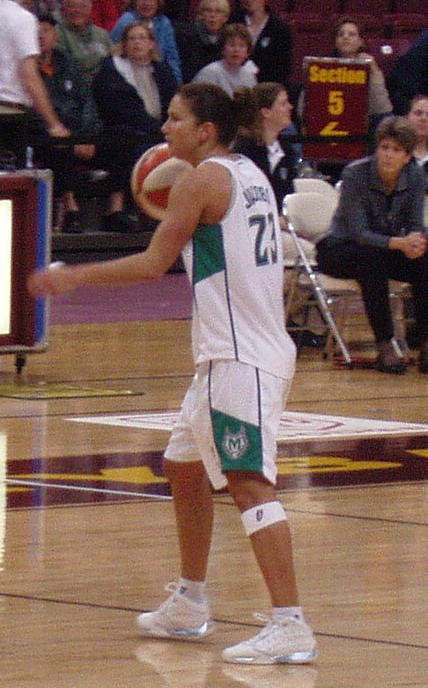

Personal information
- Born: June 29, 1982 (age 44) Elkhart, Indiana, U.S.
- Listed height: 5 ft 8 in (1.73 m)
- Listed weight: 152 lb (69 kg)

Career information
- High school: Abington Heights (Clarks Summit, Pennsylvania)
- College: Boston College (2000–2004)
- WNBA draft: 2004: 3rd round, 33rd overall pick
- Drafted by: Minnesota Lynx
- Playing career: 2004–2008
- Position: Point guard

Career history
- 2004–2007: Minnesota Lynx
- 2008: Washington Mystics
- 2008: Los Angeles Sparks

Career highlights
- Big East All-Freshman Team (2001)
- Stats at Basketball Reference

Amber Jacobs (born June 29, 1982) is an American former professional basketball player in the Women's National Basketball Association (WNBA), for the Los Angeles Sparks. She then became the assistant athletic director for Clarks Summit University and their head women's basketball coach. Prior to that, Jacobs was an assistant coach at the University of Rhode Island women's basketball team under her former head coach at Boston College Cathy Inglese.

After attending Abington Heights High School in Clarks Summit, Pennsylvania, Jacobs attended college at Boston College and graduated in 2004. Following her collegiate career, she was selected as the 33rd overall pick in the 2004 WNBA draft.

Primarily as reserve in her first two seasons, Jacobs averaged 3.4 points and 1.8 assists per game. She became Lynx starting point guard in 2006 and averaged 8.2 points and 3.4 assists per game.

With the acquisitions of rookies Lindsey Harding and Noelle Quinn, Jacobs returned to a reserve role in 2007. She appeared in 29 games, averaging 3.2 points and 1.4 assists in 11.3 minutes per game.

During the WNBA offseason, Jacobs has served as an assistant coach with the University of Toledo women's basketball team for two years. She then spent a season in Ribera, Italy playing in the Italian League. During the off-season 2007–2008, Jacobs was a personal trainer in Florida. On March 17, 2008, the Washington Mystics signed Jacobs when the Minnesota Lynx did not match the offer sheet. On June 23, 2008, Jacobs was waived by the Washington Mystics. She was then signed by the Los Angeles Sparks July 7, 2008. On July 29, 2008, Jacobs was waived by the Los Angeles Sparks.

On June 1, 2010, she was announced as the Head Women's Basketball Coach at Clarks Summit University in Clarks Summit, Pennsylvania.

In 2016, Jacobs was selected by Boston College to be their representative to the 12th Annual Class of "ACC Women's Basketball Legends."

== WNBA career statistics ==
Legend
GP	Games played	GS	Games started	MPG	Minutes per game	RPG	Rebounds per game
APG	Assists per game	SPG	Steals per game	BPG	Blocks per game	PPG	Points per game
TO	Turnovers per game	FG%	Field-goal percentage	3P%	3-point field-goal percentage	FT%	Free-throw percentage
**Bold**	Career best	°	League leader

=== Regular season ===
Year	Team	GP	GS	MPG	FG%	3P%	FT%	RPG	APG	SPG	BPG	TO	PPG
2004	Minnesota	32	0	12.2	.310	.317	.909	1.1	1.5	0.4	0.0	1.4	3.2
2005	Minnesota	33	0	14.5	.385	.377	.724	0.6	2.1	0.6	**0.1**	1.4	3.7
2006	Minnesota	**34**	**34**	**25.3**	**.449**	.392	.825	2.6	3.4	**0.8**	**0.1**	2.6	**8.2**
2007	Minnesota	29	0	11.3	.333	.262	.615	0.7	1.4	0.3	0.0	1.4	3.2
2008	Washington	6	3	13.7	.250	.300	.500	**1.2**	1.8	0.5	0.0	1.3	1.7
2008	Los Angeles	5	0	12.2	.273	**.400**	**1.000**	0.4	1.2	0.0	0.0	1.6	2.0
Career	5 years, 3 teams	139	37	15.8	.381	.324	.792	1.3	2.1	0.5	0.0	1.7	4.4

=== Playoffs ===
Year	Team	GP	GS	MPG	FG%	3P%	FT%	RPG	APG	SPG	BPG	TO	PPG
2004	Minnesota	2	0	18.0	.600	.500	.500	0.5	1.0	0.0	0.0	2.0	4.0
Career	1 year, 1 team	2	0	18.0	.600	.500	.500	0.5	1.0	0.0	0.0	2.0	4.0

== Boston College statistics ==
Legend
GP	Games played	GS	Games started	MPG	Minutes per game
FG%	Field goal percentage	3P%	3-point field goal percentage	FT%	Free throw percentage
RPG	Rebounds per game	APG	Assists per game	SPG	Steals per game
BPG	Blocks per game	PPG	Points per game	**Bold**	Career high

Year	Team	GP	Points	FG%	3P%	FT%	RPG	APG	SPG	BPG	PPG
2000–01	Boston College	29	333	42.9	31.0	76.4	1.9	3.8	1.3	0.0	11.5
2001–02	Boston College	31	368	43.6	34.5	71.4	2.5	3.5	1.3	**0.1**	11.9
2002–03	Boston College	31	374	41.2	39.4	**91.2**	2.3	3.6	**1.4**	0.0	12.1
2003–04	Boston College	**32**	**469**	**48.4**	**39.9**	84.7	**2.9**	**4.3**	1.2	**0.1**	**14.7**
Career	Boston College	123	1535	43.9	34.7	82.0	2.4	3.8	1.3	0.1	12.5
