= Navonda Moore =

American basketball player (born 1984)

Personal information
- Born: November 4, 1984 (age 42) Jackson, Mississippi, U.S.
- Listed height: 5 ft 10 in (1.78 m)
- Listed weight: 145 lb (66 kg)

Career information
- High school: Murrah (Jackson, Mississippi)
- College: Alabama (2003–2007)
- WNBA draft: 2007: undrafted
- Position: Guard
- Number: 34

Career history
- 2007–2008: Minnesota Lynx

Career highlights
- Mississippi Miss Basketball (2003)
- Stats at Basketball Reference

Navonda Moore (born November 4, 1984) is an American professional women's basketball player in the WNBA, previously playing for the Minnesota Lynx.

Born in Jackson, Mississippi, Moore attended college at the University of Alabama and graduated in 2007. Following her collegiate career with Alabama Crimson Tide women's basketball, she joined the Lynx as a free agent.

As an undrafted rookie, Moore struggled to get into the Lynx rotation. She averaged 4.6 minutes and 1.1 points in 19 games.

== WNBA career statistics ==
Legend
GP	Games played	GS	Games started	MPG	Minutes per game	RPG	Rebounds per game
APG	Assists per game	SPG	Steals per game	BPG	Blocks per game	PPG	Points per game
TO	Turnovers per game	FG%	Field-goal percentage	3P%	3-point field-goal percentage	FT%	Free-throw percentage
**Bold**	Career best	°	League leader

=== Regular season ===
Year	Team	GP	GS	MPG	FG%	3P%	FT%	RPG	APG	SPG	BPG	TO	PPG
2007	Minnesota	**19**	0	4.6	.269	.125	**.750**	0.8	0.2	0.2	0.0	0.4	1.1
2008	Minnesota	16	0	**7.8**	**.319**	**.333**	.556	**0.9**	**0.3**	**0.3**	**0.2**	0.2	**3.0**
Career	2 years, 1 team	35	0	6.1	.301	.235	.600	0.9	0.3	0.2	0.1	0.3	2.0

== Alabama statistics ==
Legend
GP	Games played	GS	Games started	MPG	Minutes per game
FG%	Field goal percentage	3P%	3-point field goal percentage	FT%	Free throw percentage
RPG	Rebounds per game	APG	Assists per game	SPG	Steals per game
BPG	Blocks per game	PPG	Points per game	**Bold**	Career high

Year	Team	GP	Points	FG%	3P%	FT%	RPG	APG	SPG	BPG	PPG
2003–04	Alabama	23	215	**42.4**	23.3	71.9	3.6	1.3	1.8	0.1	9.3
2004–05	Alabama	**29**	237	40.4	**38.6**	69.8	3.9	0.7	0.8	0.2	8.2
2005–06	Alabama	27	342	39.2	27.9	69.9	**4.7**	**1.9**	1.8	0.4	12.7
2006–07	Alabama	**29**	**395**	40.1	28.7	**75.0**	4.1	1.7	**2.1**	0.4	**13.6**
Career	Alabama	108	1189	40.3	29.4	71.5	4.1	1.4	1.6	0.3	11.0
