= Roger Griffith =

American basketball executive

- Education: Augsburg College
- Spouse: Jean
- Children: Emma and Abby

Roger Griffith is an American basketball executive..

Griffith initially worked for the Minnesota Lynx' sibling team, the Minnesota Timberwolves, as executive vice president and chief financial officer. Prior to that, he had worked for Timberwolves and Lynx owner Glen Taylor at Taymark.

Griffith succeeded the Lynx's first coach and general manager, Brian Agler, in 2003. While his hiring was relatively uneventful, he eventually received some criticism from fans, especially during a long playoff drought during the first part of his tenure as general manager. These calls stopped, however, after Griffith hired coach Cheryl Reeve, and built a team around Seimone Augustus, Lindsay Whalen, and Maya Moore. The team won six Western Conference championships and four WNBA championships between 2011 and 2017.

Griffith is married to the daughter of Lynx and Timberwolves owner Glen Taylor, and the two have two children.

Sporting positions
Preceded by Brian Agler	Minnesota Lynx General Manager; 2003–2010	Succeeded by Cheryl Reeve
