= 2008 Minnesota Lynx season =

Tenth season for the Minnesota Lynx

- Head coach: Don Zierden
- Arena: Target Center

Results
- Record: 16–18 (.471)
- Place: 7th (Western)
- Playoff finish: Did not qualify

The 2008 Minnesota Lynx season was the 10th season for the Minnesota Lynx of the Women's National Basketball Association, and the second and final season under head coach Don Zierden.

The Lynx finished the season 16–18, which saw them finish in seventh place in the playoff standings an improvement from 10-24 from the previous two seasons, However the Lynx missed the postseason for the fourth consecutive season.

== Offseason ==
=== Expansion draft ===
- Kristen Mann was selected in the 2008 Expansion Draft for the Atlanta Dream.

=== WNBA draft ===
Round	Pick	Player	Nationality	School
1	3	Candice Wiggins	United States	Stanford
2	16	Nicky Anosike	United States	Tennessee
3	30	Charde Houston	United States	Connecticut

== Transactions ==
=== Trades ===
March 14, 2008	To Minnesota Lynx Kristen Rasmussen	To Connecticut Sun Tamika Raymond and the right to swap second-round picks in the 2009 WNBA draft.
June 22, 2008	To Minnesota Lynx LaToya Thomas	To Detroit Shock Eshaya Murphy

=== Free agents ===
Player	Signed	Former team
Anna DeForge	February 19, 2008	Indiana Fever
Sharnee' Zoll	May 18, 2008	Virginia (Undrafted)

Player	Left	New team
Amber Jacobs	March 17, 2008	Washington Mystics
Sharnee' Zoll	June 26, 2008	

Player	Re-signed
Nicole Ohlde	March 3, 2008
Vanessa Hayden	April 18, 2008

== Regular season ==
=== Season standings ===
Western Conference	W	L	PCT	GB	Home	Road	Conf.
San Antonio Silver Stars ^{x}	24	10	.706	–	15–2	9–8	10–10
Seattle Storm ^{x}	22	12	.647	2.0	16–1	6–11	13–7
Los Angeles Sparks ^{x}	20	14	.588	4.0	12–5	8–9	12–8
Sacramento Monarchs ^{x}	18	16	.529	6.0	5–12	13–4	9–11
Houston Comets ^{o}	17	17	.500	7.0	13–4	4–13	10–10
Minnesota Lynx ^{o}	16	18	.471	8.0	10–7	6–11	8–12
Phoenix Mercury ^{o}	16	18	.471	8.0	9–8	7–10	8–12

=== Season schedule ===
Date	Opponent	Score	Leading Scorer	Attendance	Record
May 18	vs. Detroit	84-70	Charde Houston (21)	9,972	1-0
May 27	@ Houston	98-92 (OT)	Seimone Augustus (25)	7,261	2-0
May 29	@ Chicago	75-69	Seimone Augustus (19)	3,014	3-0
May 31	vs. Phoenix	94-83	Seimone Augustus (22)	6,914	4-0
June 3	@ Atlanta	85-81	Candice Wiggins (22)	5,844	5-0
June 6	@ Connecticut	77-78	Seimone Augustus (22)	6,327	5-1
June 8	vs. San Antonio	90-78	Seimone Augustus (18)	5,020	6-1
June 10	vs. Connecticut	66-75	Candice Wiggins (22)	7,186	6-2
June 12	vs. Sacramento	78-82	Seimone Augustus (21)	4,875	6-3
June 14	@ New York	76-77	Candice Wiggins (26)	7,452	6-4
June 20	@ Detroit	93-98 (OT)	Seimone Augustus (26)	8,916	6-5
June 21	vs. Houston	65-72	Candice Wiggins (24)	5,865	6-6
June 24	vs. New York	91-69	Seimone Augustus (21)	6,280	7-6
June 26	vs. Sacramento	80-76	Seimone Augustus (23)	5,722	8-6
June 28	@ San Antonio	65-73	Nicky Anosike (16)	7,513	8-7
July 1	vs. Chicago	71-73	Candice Wiggins (17)	4,765	8-8
July 3	@ Los Angeles	88-70	Seimone Augustus (29)	8,587	9-8
July 5	@ Seattle	71-96	Nicky Anosike (15)	7,553	9-9
July 9	vs. Atlanta	67-73	Seimone Augustus (17)	5,893	9-10
July 12	vs. Houston	85-71	Seimone Augustus (27)	6,495	10-10
July 17	@ Houston	88-96	Candice Wiggins (27)	7,261	10-11
July 19	@ San Antonio	87-74	Seimone Augustus (30)	8,614	11-11
July 22	vs. Seattle	73-76	Charde Houston (16)	12,276	11-12
July 24	@ Indiana	84-80 (OT)	Seimone Augustus (25)	6,010	12-12
July 25	vs. San Antonio	78-68	Seimone Augustus (20)	7,247	13-12
July 27	vs. Los Angeles	84-92 (OT)	Seimone Augustus (29)	9,433	13-13
August 30	vs. Washington	92-78	Candice Wiggins (22)	6,980	14-13
September 1	@ Los Angeles	58-82	Seimone Augustus (13)	9,072	14-14
September 3	@ Phoenix	96-103	Seimone Augustus (27)	7,722	14-15
September 6	@ Seattle	88-96	Seimone Augustus (26)	9,339	14-16
September 7	@ Sacramento	71-78	Charde Houston (19)	7,999	14-17
September 9	vs. Indiana	86-76	Charde Houston (18)	6,706	15-17
September 12	vs. Phoenix	87-96	Lindsey Harding (20)	8,343	15-18
September 14	@ Washington	96-70	Charde Houston (18)	10,438	16-18

== Player stats ==
Legend
GP	Games played	GS	Games started	MPG	Minutes per game
FG%	Field-goal percentage	3P%	3-point field-goal percentage	FT%	Free-throw percentage
RPG	Rebounds per game	APG	Assists per game	SPG	Steals per game
BPG	Blocks per game	PPG	Points per game

=== Regular season ===
Player	GP	GS	MPG	FG%	3P%	FT%	RPG	APG	SPG	BPG	PPG
Seimone Augustus	31	31	33.6	.470	.317	.890	3.9	2.7	1.0	0.4	19.1
Candice Wiggins	30	1	27.5	.403	.306	.817	3.2	3.0	1.8	0.2	15.7
Nicky Anosike	34	34	27.1	.438	.000	.699	6.8	1.3	2.2	1.2	9.2
Charde Houston	33	0	17.6	.492	.000	.741	3.7	0.8	0.9	0.4	8.8
Anna DeForge	34	34	24.9	.391	.364	.763	3.0	1.7	0.8	0.2	8.5
Lindsey Harding	24	11	24.6	.367	.080	.694	2.3	3.2	1.1	0.2	6.4
Nicole Ohlde	34	34	16.4	.453	.000	.785	3.3	1.3	0.3	0.7	5.8
Vanessa Hayden	30	0	10.1	.445	.000	.614	3.5	0.4	0.5	0.5	5.2
Noelle Quinn	32	25	16.7	.398	.313	.667	2.2	2.5	0.7	0.1	3.6
LaToya Thomas	13	0	11.3	.500	.714	.444	1.9	0.2	0.2	0.0	3.6
Navonda Moore	16	0	7.8	.319	.333	.556	0.9	0.3	0.3	0.2	3.0
Kristen Rasmussen	31	0	12.7	.375	.348	.739	2.7	0.9	0.4	0.2	2.5
Sharnee' Zoll	6	0	5.0	.250	.333	.833	0.5	0.5	0.2	0.0	1.7
Eshaya Murphy	2	0	2.5	.200	.000	.000	1.0	0.0	0.0	0.0	1.0

Minnesota Lynx Regular Season Stats

== Roster ==
2008 Minnesota Lynx roster
Players
Coaches

Pos.	No.	Nat.	Name	Height	Weight	From
F/C	21	(United States)	Anosike, Nicky	6' 4" (1.93m)	211 lb (96kg)	Tennessee
G	33	(United States)	Augustus, Seimone	6' 0" (1.83m)	179 lb (81kg)	LSU
G	30	(United States)	DeForge, Anna	5' 10" (1.78m)	160 lb (73kg)	Nebraska
G	10	(United States)	Harding, Lindsey	5' 8" (1.73m)	139 lb (63kg)	Duke
C	55	(United States)	Hayden-Johnson, Vanessa	6' 4" (1.93m)	240 lb (109kg)	Florida
F	20	(United States)	Houston, Charde	6' 1" (1.85m)	189 lb (86kg)	Connecticut
G	34	(United States)	Moore, Navonda	5' 10" (1.78m)	145 lb (66kg)	Alabama
F/C	3	(United States)	Ohlde, Nicole	6' 5" (1.96m)	190 lb (86kg)	Kansas State
G	45	(United States)	Quinn, Noelle	6' 0" (1.83m)	175 lb (79kg)	UCLA
F	52	(United States)	Rasmussen, Kristen	6' 4" (1.93m)	172 lb (78kg)	Michigan State
F	1	(Italy)	Ress, Kathrin	6' 4" (1.93m)	208 lb (94kg)	Boston College
F	32	(United States)	Thomas, LaToya	6' 2" (1.88m)	165 lb (75kg)	Mississippi State
G	11	(United States)	Wiggins, Candice	5' 11" (1.8m)	154 lb (70kg)	Stanford

Head coach
(United States) Don Zierden (Mount Senario)
Assistant coaches
(United States) Ed Prohofsky (Minnesota)
(United States) Julie Plank (Ohio State)
(United States) Jennifer Gillom (Mississippi)
Athletic trainer
(United States) Chuck Barta (UW–La Crosse)
Strength and conditioning coach
(United States) Tom Conroy

Legend

- (C) Team captain
- (DP) Unsigned draft pick
- (FA) Free agent
- (S) Suspended
- Injured

WNBA roster page

== Awards and honors ==
- Seimone Augustus, WNBA Player of the Week (May 26 - June 1)
- Nicky Anosike, WNBA All-Rookie Team (Center)
- Candace Wiggins, WNBA All-Rookie Team (Guard)
- Candice Wiggins, WNBA Sixth Woman of the Year
