= Carolyn Jenkins =

American basketball player-coach

Personal information
- Born: January 29, 1969 (age 57) Fresno, California, U.S.

Career information
- College: University of California
- Coaching career: 1991–2007

Career history

Coaching
- 1991–1995: Stanford (assistant)
- 1996–2000: Michigan State (assistant)
- 2000–2003: Sacramento State
- 2003–2007: Minnesota Lynx (assistant)
- 2006: Minnesota Lynx (interim)

Carolyn Charise Jenkins (born January 29, 1969, in Fresno, California), is the assistant commissioner for operations of the West Coast Conference. Previously, Jenkins served as a women's basketball coach in the WNBA, serving as an assistant coach and head coach of the Minnesota Lynx, and as Director of Player Personnel for the WNBA.

Jenkins earned her Bachelor of Arts degree in economics from UC Berkeley (Cal) in 1990. While at Cal, she played 104 career games in four seasons with the Golden Bears from 1986 to 1990.

After assistant coaching stints at Stanford and Michigan State, Jenkins became the head coach for the women's basketball team at Sacramento State University for three seasons.

Jenkins became the Minnesota Lynx fourth head coach in 2006 after Suzie McConnell-Serio resigned on July 23. She led the Lynx to a 2–9 record to close out the 2006 WNBA Season.

In December 2006, longtime NBA assistant Don Zierden was named the Lynx head coach, and Jenkins was retained in her current assistant coaching position. On November 1, 2007, Jenkins was named director of player personnel of the WNBA.

== Head coaching record ==
Team	Year	G	W	L	W–L%	Finish	PG	PW	PL	PW–L%	Result
Minnesota	2006	11	2	9	.182	7th in Western	—	—	—	—	Missed playoffs
Career		11	2	9	.182		—	—	—	—	

Sporting positions
Preceded by Suzie McConnell Serio	Minnesota Lynx Head Coach; 2006	Succeeded by Don Zierden
