= Minnesota Lynx =

Women's National Basketball Association franchise based in Minneapolis, Minnesota, U.S.

- 2026 Minnesota Lynx season
- Conference: Western
- Leagues: WNBA
- Founded: 1999
- History: Minnesota Lynx; 1999–present
- Arena: Target Center
- Location: Minneapolis, Minnesota, U.S.
- Team colors: Midnight navy blue, lake blue, aurora green, moonlight grey
- Main sponsor: Mayo Clinic
- President: Cheryl Reeve
- General manager: Vacant
- Head coach: Cheryl Reeve
- Assistants: Rebekkah Brunson; Eric Thibault; Lindsay Whalen
- Ownership: Alex Rodriguez; Marc Stad
- Championships: 4 (2011, 2013, 2015, 2017)
- Conference titles: 4 (2011, 2012, 2013, 2015) (Note: The WNBA awarded conference championships to the winners of the Conference Finals in the playoffs from 1998 to 2015.)
- Commissioner's Cup titles: 1 (2024)
- Retired numbers: 5 (13), (23), (32), (33), (34)
- Website: lynx.wnba.com
Heroine	Explorer	Rebel

The Minnesota Lynx are an American professional basketball team based in Minneapolis. The Lynx compete in the Women's National Basketball Association (WNBA) as a member of the Western Conference. The team won the WNBA title in 2011, 2013, 2015, and 2017.

Founded prior to the 1999 season, the team was owned by Glen Taylor, who was also the majority owner of the Lynx's NBA counterpart, the Minnesota Timberwolves, from 1999 to 2025. The current owners of the Lynx are Alex Rodriguez and Marc Lore. The franchise has been home to players such as Katie Smith, Seimone Augustus, Minnesota native Lindsay Whalen, Maya Moore, Rebekkah Brunson, and Sylvia Fowles.

The Lynx have qualified for the WNBA playoffs in 15 of their 26 years.

== History ==
=== Joining the league (1998–2004) ===
On April 22, 1998, the WNBA announced that Minnesota, alongside the Orlando Miracle, would be receiving an expansion team for the 1999 season. The Minnesota team was officially named the Minnesota Lynx on December 5, 1998; the state contains both Canada lynx and red lynx (bobcat) populations.

The league held their second expansion draft for the Lynx and the Miracle on April 6, 1999. The Lynx began their inaugural season in 1999 with 12,122 fans in attendance at Target Center. The Lynx defeated the Detroit Shock 68–51 to win the franchise's first regular-season game They finished their first season 15–17 overall and held the same record in 2000.

In 2001, the Lynx took a turn for the worse as they posted a 12–20 record. Following their poor 2001 performance, the Lynx began the 2002 season 6-13. This prompted the team to replace their head coach, Brian Agler. The Lynx's first head coach finished his tenure with a 47–67 record in three-plus seasons. Heidi VanDerveer became the interim head coach for the remainder of the 2002 season. Her interum position would ultimately not be extended as the team completed their remaining schedule 4-9 for an overall 10–22 record, worst in franchise history (until 2006).

Suzie McConnell-Serio took over as head coach for the 2003 season. She led the team to finish with a franchise-best 18–16 record, the Lynx's first winning season. The team also advanced to the WNBA Playoffs for the first time, winning Game 1 but ultimately losing the best-of-three series 2-1 to the Los Angeles Sparks. The 2004 season would see the Lynx finish with the same record, and making the playoffs for their second consecutive year, falling this time 2-0 to the eventual winner, Seattle Storm, in the Western Conference semifinals.

=== Seimone Augustus joins the team (2005–2007) ===
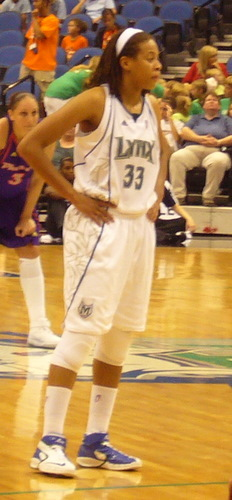
Seimone Augustus

The 2005 season was one of transition for the franchise. Leading scorer Katie Smith was dealt to Detroit in July and the team stumbled down the stretch, missing the playoffs for the first time in three years. The poor finish did pay off however, as the team won the draft lottery and selected All-American guard Seimone Augustus of Louisiana State University with the first overall pick in the 2006 WNBA draft.

The Lynx began the 2006 season as the youngest team in the WNBA. On May 31, the team set the WNBA single-game scoring record (at the time), routing the Los Angeles Sparks by a score of 114–71. Despite this victory and with her team floundering to an 8–15 record, head coach McConnell-Serio resigned on July 23. She was replaced by assistant Carolyn Jenkins, who piloted the squad to a 2–9 finish. The team's 24 losses set a franchise record.

Following the season, Augustus was named the 2006 WNBA Rookie of the Year. Her 21.9 points per game is still a WNBA rookie record. The 22-year-old was the second player in team history to win the award.

On December 13, 2006, the Lynx named veteran NBA assistant Don Zierden their fifth head coach.

In the 2007 WNBA draft, the Lynx traded center Tangela Smith, whom they acquired in the dispersal draft from the Charlotte Sting, to the Phoenix Mercury for point guard Lindsey Harding, who had been selected first overall.

The Lynx began the 2007 season 0–7, lost ten straight in July and failed to get into the playoff race. They finished tying a league-worst 10–24 record. On November 1, 2007, assistant coach and former head coach Carolyn Jenkins was named Director of Player Personnel of the WNBA.

=== Hot starts without results (2008–2009) ===
The 2008 season started out much different for the Lynx than in previous years. They came flying out of the gates, going 7–1 in the first five weeks of the season. The Lynx then cooled off. They managed to play competitive basketball all season, but lost many key games down the stretch. The Lynx finished with a 16–18 record in a tough Western Conference where every team was in the playoff chase until the final week of the season. The Lynx however, did not qualify. After two consecutive 10–24 seasons, the 2008 Lynx was a step in the right direction.

In 2009, Zierden resigned just days before the start of the season. Jennifer Gillom who replaced Teresa Edwards as an assistant coach the previous year, was promoted to head coach. Another Zierden Lynx assistant, former NBA player Jim Petersen stayed with Gillom during the season, working with post players Charde Houston and Nicky Anosike. The Lynx saw similar results in 2008. They started with a good run (7–3), but lost many key games, including a six-game losing streak, and finished 14–20, out from the playoffs for the fifth straight season.

=== A new team and the first championship (2010–2011) ===
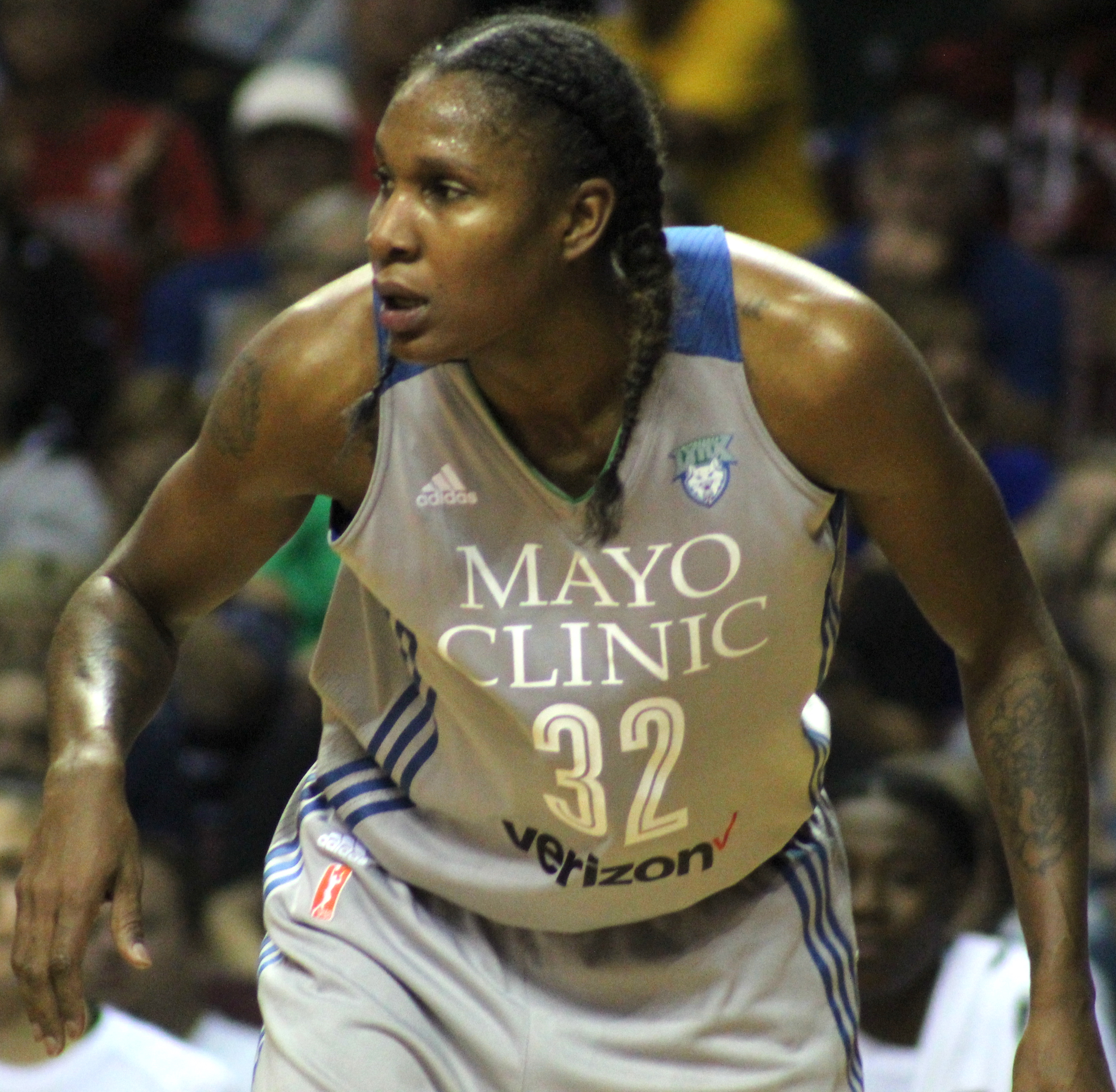
Rebekkah Brunson won four of her five WNBA championships with the Lynx.

After five disappointing seasons, the off-season brought much more impact to the franchise. The team hired former Detroit Shock assistant coach Cheryl Reeve as their new head coach, parting ways with Jennifer Gillom, who took the head coaching job of the Los Angeles Sparks. The Lynx also made some moves in the off-season by selecting Rebekkah Brunson in the Sacramento Monarchs dispersal draft, and trading their first overall pick of the 2010 WNBA draft and Renee Montgomery to the Connecticut Sun for former Minnesota Gopher Lindsay Whalen and the second overall pick. They added free agent Hamchétou Maïga to the lineup, and selected University of Virginia guard Monica Wright with the second pick in the 2010 Draft. With these off-season transactions, the Lynx looked forward to a much improved 2010 season, which was echoed by the eighth annual WNBA general manager poll – 45% of the general managers declared the Lynx the most-improved team as the 2010 season began.

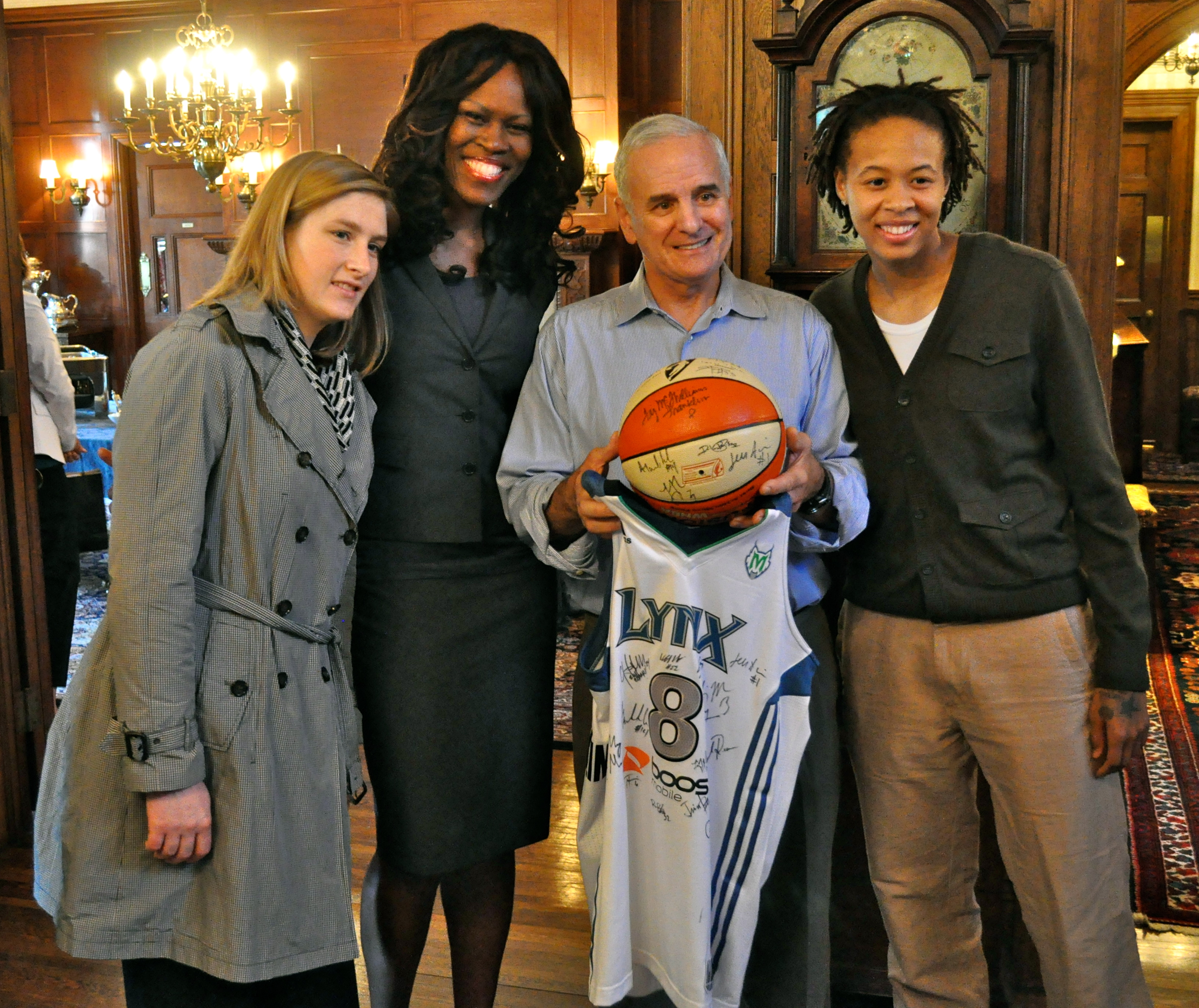
Whalen, McWilliams-Franklin, Minnesota Gov. Mark Dayton, and Augustus in 2011

The selection of Maya Moore during the 2011 WNBA draft led many people to believe the Lynx to be championship contenders for the 2011 season. The team finally lived up to expectations in 2011, behind stellar play from Seimone Augustus, Rebekkah Brunson, Moore, and Whalen, all of whom were named to the 2011 Western Conference All-Star Team. The Lynx went into the All-Star break with a 10–4 record, good for first place in the conference. After losing to Phoenix in a 112–105 contest at Target Center on July 13, the Lynx went on a nine-game winning streak, at the time a franchise record and the longest in the league for 2011. The team finished with a 27–7 record, best in the WNBA and in team history.

The Lynx earned the top overall seed in the 2011 WNBA Playoffs. In the first round, they defeated the San Antonio Silver Stars two-games-to-one in the best of three series. The Lynx then swept the Phoenix Mercury in two games to win their first conference championship. In the Finals, the Lynx trailed at halftime in each game, but rallied each time to sweep the Atlanta Dream in three games, securing their first WNBA title, and the first professional championship for the state of Minnesota since the Minnesota Twins won the World Series in 1991. Seimone Augustus was named Finals MVP.

=== Road to more championships (2012–2017) ===
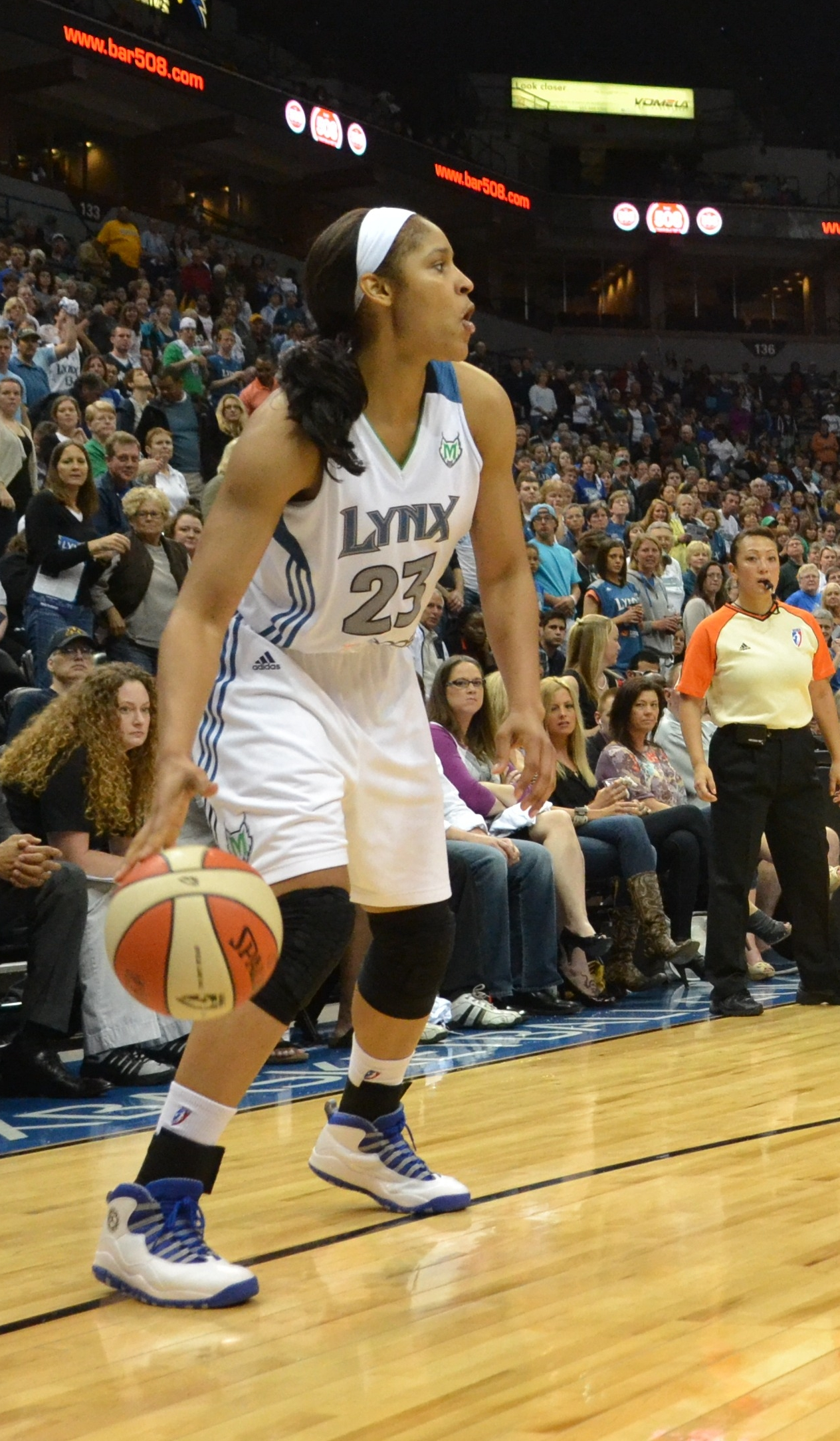
Maya Moore, 2013 Finals MVP

In 2012, the team began the season 10–0, a franchise and league record. They clinched a playoff berth on August 19, 2012, just 21 games into the season. The team fell to the Indiana Fever in the 2012 WNBA Finals.

The Lynx used both the loss in the Finals and prognosticators' pre-season focus on the Phoenix Mercury's new phenom, Brittney Griner, to motivate themselves for the 2013 season. The Lynx once again had the best record in the West. They completed their comeback, sweeping through the playoffs en route to their second championship in three years, once again defeating the Atlanta Dream. Maya Moore was named 2013 WNBA Finals MVP. Capping off a dominant championship run, the Lynx became the second WNBA team and fifth major professional sports franchise to sweep through the postseason.

In 2014, the Lynx again had a successful regular season, claiming the second best record in the league, second only to Griner and the Mercury. However, in the playoffs, the Mercury bested them 2–1 in a three-game series, and the Lynx failed to make the finals for the first time since the 2010 season.

In 2015, two-time Defensive Player of the Year Sylvia Fowles of the Chicago Sky held out of her contract until her wish was granted in July to play for Minnesota. The Lynx would go on to win their third franchise title, all three of them in a five-year span dating back to 2011. Fowles proved herself to be a crucial addition, earning finals MVP honors.

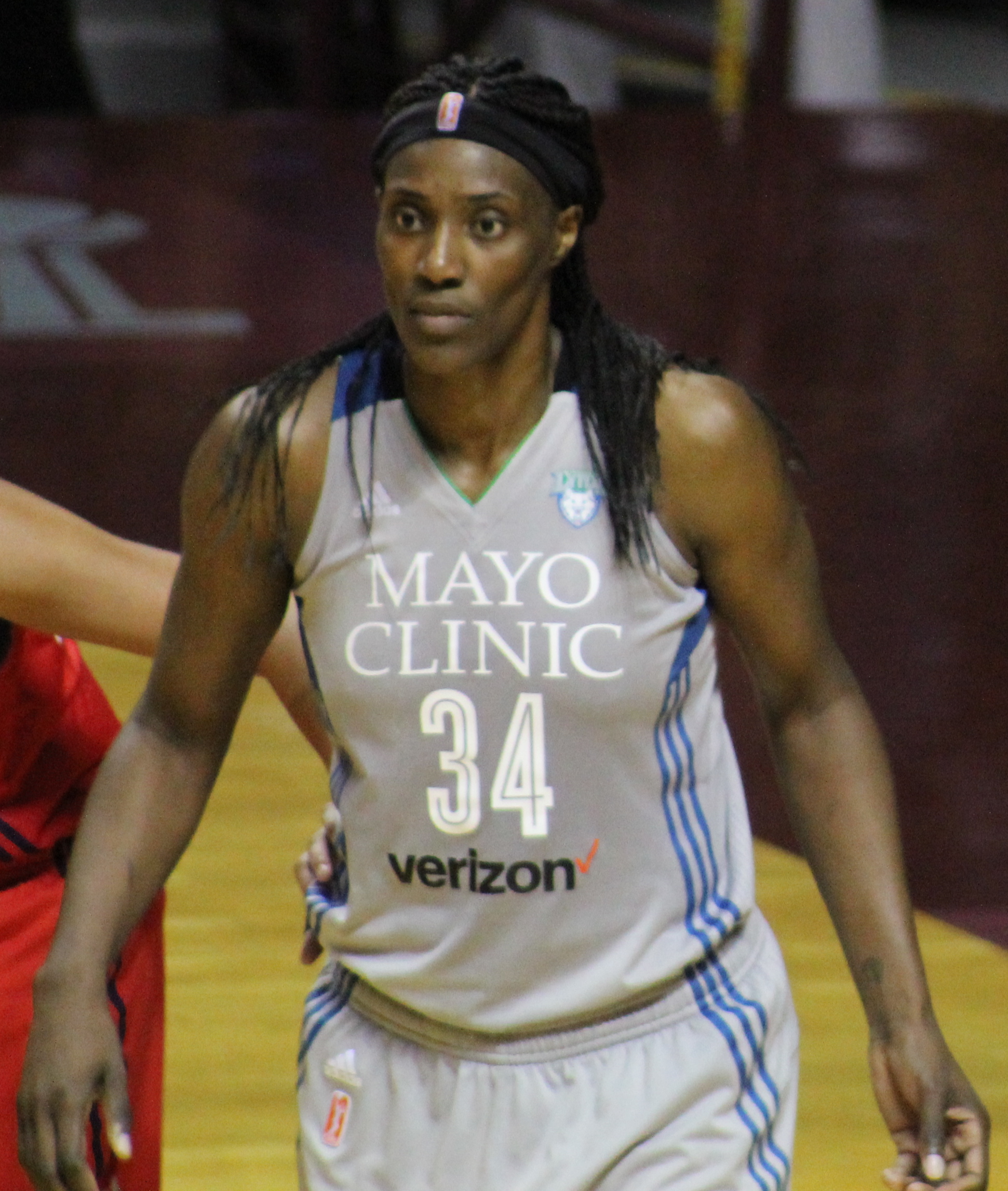
Sylvia Fowles became 2017 WNBA MVP and finals MVP twice.

After winning the WNBA title in 2015, the Lynx qualified to the 2016 WNBA Playoffs as the top seed with a franchise record 28–6 finish, only entering in the semi-finals to face the Phoenix Mercury. Due to the Target Center entering a renovation, the team moved to the Xcel Energy Center in Saint Paul, where the Lynx played the 2017 regular season. A sweep of the Mercury qualified the Lynx for their fifth finals in six years, with the adversary being the Los Angeles Sparks. The Lynx would not repeat their title, as the Sparks edged out the Lynx in a five-game series, eventually winning game 5 by 1 point.

On August 18, 2017, the Lynx set two WNBA records in their 111–52 defeat of the Indiana Fever: largest margin of victory (59 points) and longest unanswered scoring run (37 consecutive points). The Lynx finished as the top seed in the league, finishing 27–7. In the semi-finals, the Lynx defeated the Washington Mystics in a three-game sweep to advance to the WNBA Finals for the sixth time in seven years. The Lynx avenged 2016's Finals loss to the Sparks by defeating them in five games to win their fourth championship in seven seasons and tying the now-defunct Houston Comets for most WNBA championship titles.

=== The end of a dynasty (2018–2022) ===
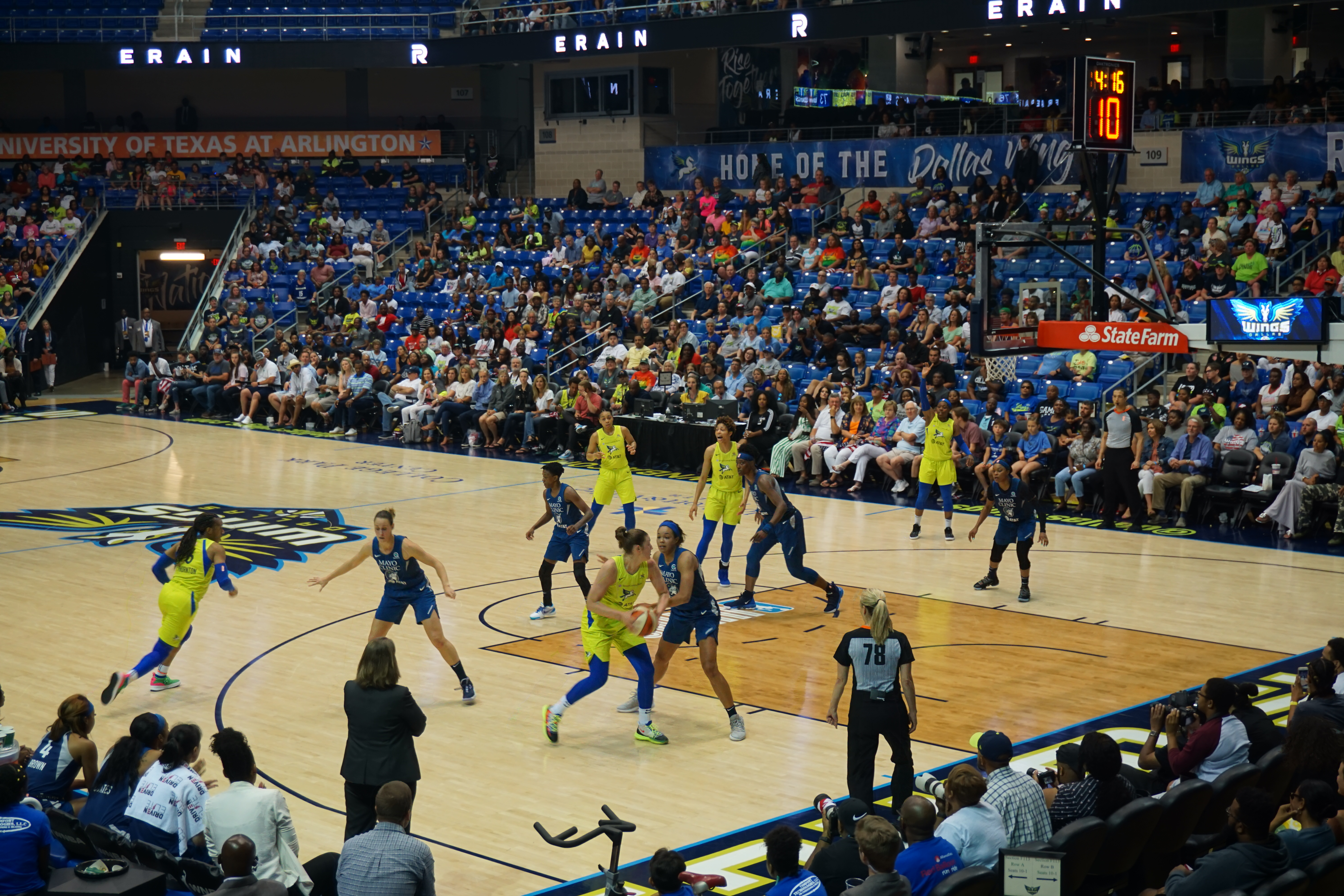
The 2019 Lynx in action at Dallas

In 2018, with back-up point guard Renee Montgomery leaving in free agency to sign with the Atlanta Dream and a now aging roster intact, the Lynx would start falling way short of championship contention. Although Moore, Fowles, Augustus and Brunson made All-Star appearances, the Lynx finished as the number 7 seed in the league with an 18–16 record. This was the first time in 8 years where the Lynx did not finish as a top 2 seed. Lindsay Whalen also announced her retirement prior to the playoffs. The Lynx started off their playoff run against the rival Los Angeles Sparks in the first round elimination game. They lost 75–68, ending their run of three consecutive Finals appearances, and it was the final game ever for Whalen, Brunson, and Moore.

In 2019 and 2020, however, the Lynx would produce players that won WNBA Rookie of the Year with Napheesa Collier and Crystal Dangerfield, respectively.

Sylvia Fowles was the last of the Lynx's dynastic five starters (Augustus, Whalen, Moore, Brunson, and Fowles) to retire when she did so after the 2022 season.

=== Collier era (2023–present) ===
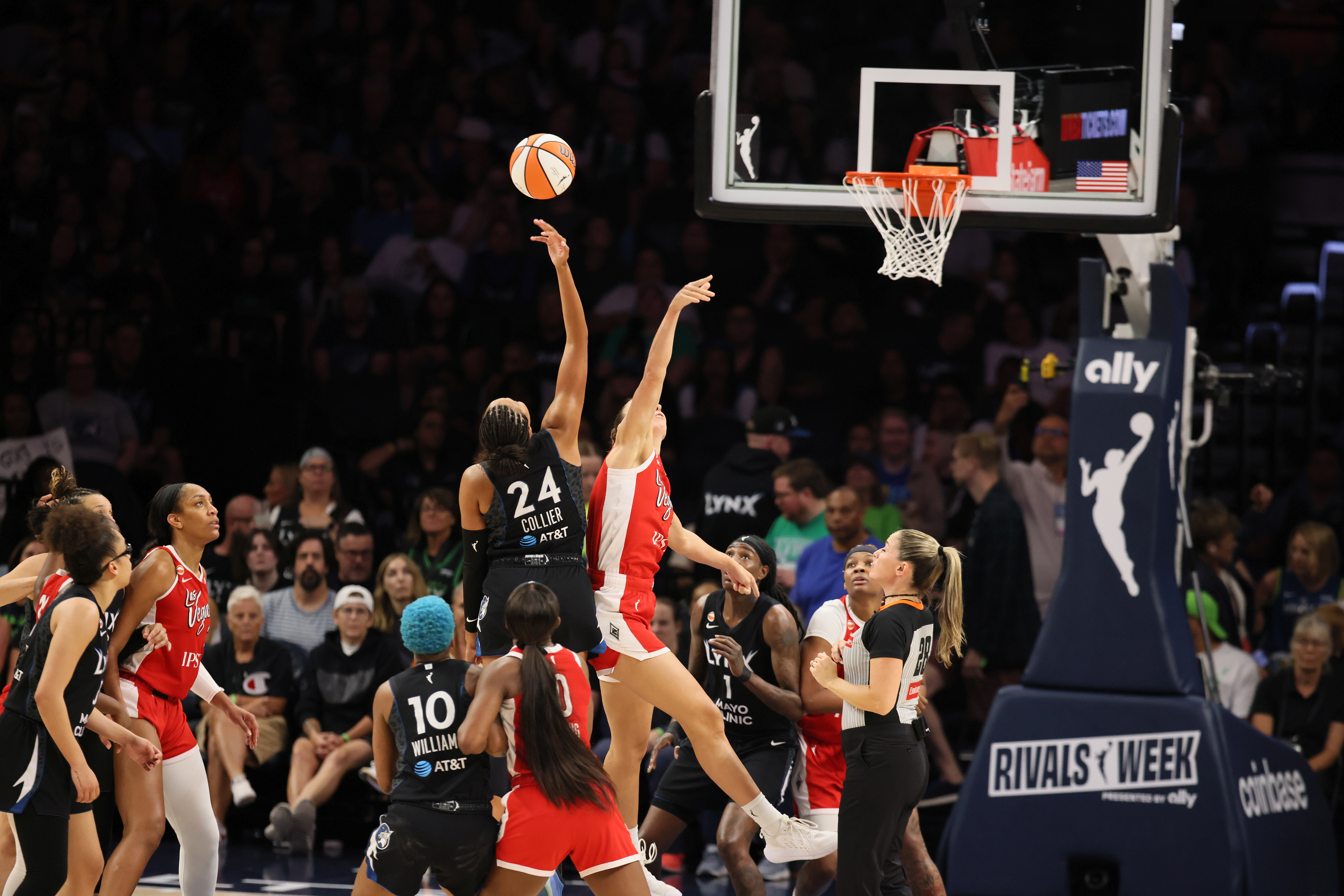
The Lynx playing the Las Vegas Aces at Target Center in August 2026.

Napheesa Collier became the new leader of the Lynx in her fifth season in the league when she returned for the 2023 season and was named the sole captain, the first time Reeve had done so while coaching the Lynx. Reeve told Winsdr about the rebuild around Collier: "“Phee is the epitome of what we want to see. A selfless person, emotionally mature, and handles ups and downs in a way that’s just really impressive... We’re trying to make sure we’re giving her a team that she wants to play with and there’s a clear direction with our team and who we’re putting around her. That’s important to us.”

With their June 11, 2024, win against the Las Vegas Aces in Vegas, the Lynx became the first WNBA team to have all five starting players each score 14+ points, 4+ rebounds, and 1+ 3 pointers.

With a score of 94–89, the Lynx won the 2024 WNBA Commissioner's Cup championship against the Liberty in their June 25, 2024, game playing in New York. Napheesa Collier was named the MVP for the championship. Collier said Bridget Carleton deserved the award for her performance in the game.

The team's 90–80 win against the Indiana Fever on August 24, 2024, clinched a playoff spot for the franchise. The game set a record for the franchise single game regular season attendance with 19,023; this is the second best attendance for any Lynx home game overall, behind only Game 5 of the 2016 WNBA Finals (19,423). The Lynx retired Maya Moore's jersey in a ceremony after the game.

=== Uniforms ===
The home uniforms are white with blue and silver trim. The team jerseys bear the logo of the team's jersey sponsor, the Mayo Clinic, in blue. The road uniforms are blue with silver and white trim and the sponsor logo written in silver. The Lynx previously used an Adidas uniform that was standard throughout the league, but the WNBA partnered with Nike, Inc. for eight years beginning in 2018. The Lynx are also one of 11 WNBA teams sponsored by Verizon, whose logo is also prominently featured on their uniforms.

During the 2016 season, the white uniforms were temporarily replaced by a new silver uniform. This was part of a league-wide initiative for its 20th season, in which all games featured all-color uniform matchups.

In 2021, the WNBA worked with Nike to redesign team uniforms. For the Lynx, this resulted in three versions, dubbed as Heroines, Explorers, and Rebels. The Heroine version was white with blue and green stripes and blue numbers. The Explorer uniform was blue with green and black trim and white numbers. The Rebel edition was black with black stars, white and silver trim, and white numbers. The team was abbreviated to MINN on the front of this jersey, which was inspired by the adjacent legendary music club First Avenue.

In 2023, the team unveiled updated Rebel versions of its uniform, which is black with green trim and white and green letters and numbers. This design includes "Change starts with us" down the side of the jerseys and on the front of the shorts. This refers back to 2016 when the team wore warm ups with that phrase to call for social justice and protest the murders of two Black men by police. The four stripes on the side of the uniforms represent the team's four championships.

=== Lynx Foundation ===
The Minnesota Lynx Foundation holds an annual "Catwalk for a Cure" event at the Mall of America during the WNBA's Breast Health Awareness Week to raise funds for breast cancer related charities. The 2011 event was held Aug 5 and raised $5,000 for Susan G. Komen for the Cure.

In 2012, the Lynx hosted the Catwalk for a Cure at the Mall of America rotunda for the first time, occupying the largest staging area inside the country's biggest mall. In addition to displaying outfits, Lynx players ended the show with a dance based on the song "Background" by Lecrae and Andy Mineo. The Lynx Foundation donated a $5,000 grant to the SAGE program, run by the Minnesota Department of Health.

During the WNBA's 2013 Breast Health Awareness Week and in partnership with the Edith Sanford Breast Cancer Foundation, the Lynx game against the Indiana Fever on August 25 was a "Pink Out" game at Target Center and on August 29, the 5th annual "Catwalk for a Cure" event was held at the Mall of America. The Lynx donated a $10,000 grant to the Edith Sanford Breast Cancer Foundation.

== Season-by-season records ==
Season	Team	Conference		Regular season			Playoff results	Head coach
Season	Team	Conference		W	L	PCT	Playoff results	Head coach
Minnesota Lynx
1999	1999	West	5th	15	17	.469	Did not qualify	Brian Agler
2000	2000	West	6th	15	17	.469	Did not qualify	Brian Agler
2001	2001	West	6th	12	20	.375	Did not qualify	Brian Agler
2002	2002	West	8th	10	22	.313	Did not qualify	B. Agler (6–13); H. VanDerveer (4–9)
2003	2003	West	4th	18	16	.529	Lost Conference Semifinals (Los Angeles, 1–2)	Suzie McConnell-Serio
2004	2004	West	3rd	18	16	.529	Lost Conference Semifinals (Seattle, 0–2)	Suzie McConnell-Serio
2005	2005	West	6th	14	20	.412	Did not qualify	Suzie McConnell-Serio
2006	2006	West	7th	10	24	.294	Did not qualify	S. Mc.-Serio (8–15); C. Jenkins (2–9)
2007	2007	West	6th	10	24	.294	Did not qualify	Don Zierden
2008	2008	West	6th	16	18	.471	Did not qualify	Don Zierden
2009	2009	West	5th	14	20	.412	Did not qualify	Jennifer Gillom
2010	2010	West	5th	13	21	.382	Did not qualify	Cheryl Reeve
2011	2011	West	1st	27	7	.794	Won Conference Semifinals (San Antonio, 2–1); Won Conference Finals (Phoenix, 2–0); Won WNBA Finals (Atlanta, 3–0)	Cheryl Reeve
2012	2012	West	1st	27	7	.794	Won Conference Semifinals (Seattle, 2–1); Won Conference Finals (Los Angeles, 2–0); Lost WNBA Finals (Indiana, 1–3)	Cheryl Reeve
2013	2013	West	1st	26	8	.765	Won Conference Semifinals (Seattle, 2–0); Won Conference Finals (Phoenix, 2–0); Won WNBA Finals (Atlanta, 3–0)	Cheryl Reeve
2014	2014	West	2nd	25	9	.735	Won Conference Semifinals (San Antonio, 2–0); Lost Conference Finals (Phoenix, 1–2)	Cheryl Reeve
2015	2015	West	1st	22	12	.647	Won Conference Semifinals (Los Angeles, 2–1); Won Conference Finals (Phoenix, 2–0); Won WNBA Finals (Indiana, 3–2)	Cheryl Reeve
2016	2016	West	1st	28	6	.824	Won Semifinals (Phoenix, 3–0); Lost WNBA Finals (Los Angeles, 2–3)	Cheryl Reeve
2017	2017	West	1st	27	7	.794	Won Semifinals (Washington, 3–0); Won WNBA Finals (Los Angeles, 3–2)	Cheryl Reeve
2018	2018	West	4th	18	16	.529	Lost First Round (Los Angeles, 0–1)	Cheryl Reeve
2019	2019	West	4th	18	16	.529	Lost First Round (Seattle, 0–1)	Cheryl Reeve
2020	2020	West	4th	14	8	.636	Won Second Round (Phoenix 1–0); Lost Semifinals (Seattle, 0–3)	Cheryl Reeve
2021	2021	West	2nd	22	10	.688	Lost Second Round (Chicago 0–1)	Cheryl Reeve
2022	2022	West	5th	14	22	.389	Did not qualify	Cheryl Reeve
2023	2023	West	3rd	19	21	.475	Lost First Round (Connecticut, 1–2)	Cheryl Reeve
2024	2024	West	1st	30	10	.750	Won First Round (Phoenix, 2–0); Won Semifinals (Connecticut, 3–2); Lost WNBA Finals (New York, 2–3)	Cheryl Reeve
2025	2025	West	1st	34	10	.773	Won First Round (Golden State, 2–0); Lost Semifinals (Phoenix 1–3)	Cheryl Reeve
2026	2026	West	1st	33	11	.750	Lost First Round (New York, 2–0)	Cheryl Reeve
Regular season				549	415	.570	4 Conference Titles	
Playoffs				53	37	.602	4 WNBA Championships	

== Players ==
=== Roster ===
Minnesota Lynx roster
Players
Coaches

Pos.	No.	Nat.	Name	Height	Weight	DOB	From	Yrs
F	55	(Australia)	Bibby, Chloe	6' 2" (1.88m)	194 lb (88kg)	1998-06-15	Maryland	1
F	12	(United States)	Brodie, Nia	6' 1" (1.85m)	177 lb (80kg)	1995-06-11	Northwestern	9
G	6	(Spain)	Buenavida, Elena	5' 9" (1.75m)	194 lb (88kg)	2004-03-08	Spain	R
G	3	(United States)	Caldwell, Maya	5' 11" (1.8m)	160 lb (73kg)	1998-12-15	Georgia	4
C	22	(Czech Republic)	Čechová, Emma (injured)	6' 5" (1.96m)	180 lb (82kg)	2004-07-12	Czech Republic	R
F	24	(United States)	Collier, Napheesa (C)	6' 1" (1.85m)	182 lb (83kg)	1996-09-23	Connecticut	7
G	8	(Belgium)	Delaere, Antonia	5' 11" (1.8m)	155 lb (70kg)	1994-08-01	Belgium	R
F	1	(United States)	Howard, Natasha	6' 3" (1.91m)	172 lb (78kg)	1991-09-02	Florida State	12
C	14	(Hungary)	Juhász, Dorka	6' 5" (1.96m)	201 lb (91kg)	1999-12-18	Connecticut	2
F	2	(United States)	King, Liatu	5' 11" (1.8m)	178 lb (81kg)	2002-02-10	Notre Dame	1
F	7	(Russia)	Kosu, Anastasiia	6' 1" (1.85m)	190 lb (86kg)	2005-04-21	Russia	1
G	21	(United States)	McBride, Kayla	5' 11" (1.8m)	179 lb (81kg)	1992-06-25	Notre Dame	12
G	4	(United States)	McDonald, Aari	5' 6" (1.68m)	141 lb (64kg)	1998-08-20	Arizona	5
G	5	(United States)	Miles, Olivia	5' 10" (1.78m)	168 lb (76kg)	2003-01-29	TCU	R
G	10	(United States)	Williams, Courtney	5' 8" (1.73m)	147 lb (67kg)	1994-05-11	South Florida	10

Head coach
(United States) Cheryl Reeve (La Salle)
Assistant coaches
(United States) Rebekkah Brunson (Georgetown)
(United States) Janel McCarville (Minnesota)
(United States) Eric Thibault (Missouri)
(United States) Lindsay Whalen (Minnesota)
Athletic trainer
(United States) Chuck Barta (UW–La Crosse)

Legend

- (C) Team captain
- (DP) Unsigned draft pick
- (FA) Free agent
- (S) Suspended
- Injured

WNBA roster page

East
ATL
CHI
CON
IND
NY
TOR
WAS
West
DAL
GS
LV
LA
MIN
PHO
POR
SEA

=== Other rights owned ===
Nationality	Name	Years pro	Last played	Drafted
France	Maia Hirsch	0	N/A	2023

=== FIBA Hall of Fame ===
Minnesota Lynx Hall of Famers
Players
No.	Name	Position	Tenure	Inducted
4	Teresa Edwards	G	2003–2004	2013

=== Retired numbers ===
Minnesota Lynx retired numbers
No.	Player	Position	Tenure	Date
13	Lindsay Whalen	G	2010–2018	June 8, 2019
23	Maya Moore	F	2011–2018	August 24, 2024
32	Rebekkah Brunson	PF	2010–2018	July 3, 2022
33	Seimone Augustus	G	2006–2019	May 29, 2022
34	Sylvia Fowles	C	2015–2022	June 11, 2023

== Team officials ==
=== Owners ===
==== Current ====
- Marc Lore (2025–present)
- Alex Rodriguez (2025–present)

==== Former ====
- Glen Taylor, owner of the Minnesota Timberwolves (1999–2025)

=== Head coaches ===
Minnesota Lynx head coaches
Name	Start	End	Seasons	Regular season				Playoffs			
Name	Start	End	Seasons	W	L	PCT	G	W	L	PCT	G
Brian Agler	November 17, 1998	July 16, 2002	4	48	67	.417	115	0	0	.000	0
Heidi VanDerveer	July 16, 2002	End of 2002	1	4	9	.308	13	0	0	.000	0
Suzie McConnell Serio	January 21, 2003	July 23, 2006	4	58	67	.464	125	1	4	.200	5
Carolyn Jenkins	July 23, 2006	End of 2006	1	2	9	.182	11	0	0	.000	0
Don Zierden	December 23, 2006	June 3, 2009	2	26	42	.382	68	0	0	.000	0
Jennifer Gillom	June 3, 2009	End of 2009	1	14	20	.412	34	0	0	.000	0
Cheryl Reeve	December 8, 2009	Current	16	364	190	.657	554	52	31	.627	83

=== President of Basketball Operations ===
- Cheryl Reeve (2022–present)

=== General managers ===
- Brian Agler (1999–2002)
- Roger Griffith (2003–2017)
- Cheryl Reeve (2018–2022)
- Clare Duwelius (2022–2024)
- vacant (2024–present)

=== Assistant coaches ===
- Heidi VanDerveer (1999–2001)
- Kelly Kramer (1999–2002)
- Nancy Darsch (2003–2005)
- Carolyn Jenkins (2003–2005, 2007)
- Jim Lewis (2006)
- Susan Yow (2006)
- Teresa Edwards (2007)
- Ed Prohofsky (2007–2008)
- Jennifer Gillom (2008)
- Julie Plank (2008)
- Jim Davis (2009)
- Jim Petersen (2009–2016)
- Shelley Patterson (2010–2019)
- James Wade (2017–2018)
- Walt Hopkins (2017–2019)
- Plenette Pierson (2019–2022)
- Katie Smith (2020–2024)
- Elaine Powell (2023–2024)
- Rebekkah Brunson (2020–present)
- Lindsay Whalen (2025–present)
- Eric Thibault (2025–present)

== Statistics ==
Minnesota Lynx statistics
1990s

Season	Individual			Team vs Opponents		
Season	PPG	RPG	APG	PPG	RPG	FG%
1999	B. Reed (16.4)	B. Reed (6.0)	S. Tate (3.1)	63.6 vs 66.0	28.3 vs 32.1	.389 vs .425

2000s

Season	Individual			Team vs Opponents		
Season	PPG	RPG	APG	PPG	RPG	FG%
2000	K. Smith (20.2)	B. Lennox (5.6)	K. Smith (2.8)	68.5 vs 68.4	27.2 vs 30.5	.421 vs .429
2001	K. Smith (23.1)	S. Abrosimova (6.7)	K. Paye (3.0)	64.9 vs 67.4	31.3 vs 31.8	.371 vs .390
2002	K. Smith (16.5)	T. Williams (7.4)	T. Moore (3.0)	62.6 vs 65.8	30.0 vs 28.6	.410 vs .413
2003	K. Smith (18.2)	T. Williams (6.1)	T. Edwards (4.4)	70.0 vs 69.7	31.7 vs 29.1	.442 vs .425
2004	K. Smith (18.8)	T. Williams (6.0)	H. Darling (3.5)	63.7 vs 64.4	31.1 vs 30.5	.404 vs .408
2005	N. Ohlde (11.2)	N. Ohlde (5.7)	K. Harrower (2.8)	65.0 vs 67.3	30.1 vs 31.0	.412 vs .427
2006	S. Augustus (21.9)	T. Williams (5.6)	A. Jacobs (3.4)	74.2 vs 80.4	33.6 vs 35.4	.427 vs .434
2007	S. Augustus (22.6)	N. Ohlde (6.1)	N. Quinn (4.4)	77.5 vs 80.9	34.8 vs 32.9	.412 vs .450
2008	S. Augustus (19.1)	N. Anosike (6.8)	L. Harding (3.2)	81.4 vs 80.0	33.7 vs 35.6	.430 vs .439
2009	N. Anosike (13.2)	N. Anosike (7.4)	N. Anosike (2.7)	80.3 vs 83.1	32.0 vs 34.3	.420 vs .461

2010s

Season	Individual			Team vs Opponents		
Season	PPG	RPG	APG	PPG	RPG	FG%
2010	S. Augustus (16.9)	R. Brunson (10.3)	L. Whalen (5.6)	78.7 vs 82.1	35.2 vs 34.9	.397 vs .446
2011	S. Augustus (16.2)	R. Brunson (8.9)	L. Whalen (5.9)	81.5 vs 73.6	36.5 vs 30.1	.461 vs .413
2012	S. Augustus (16.6)	R. Brunson (8.9)	L. Whalen (5.4)	86.0 vs 76.2	37.8 vs 30.9	.473 vs .407
2013	M. Moore (18.5)	R. Brunson (8.9)	L. Whalen (5.8)	82.9 vs 73.5	36.9 vs 32.2	.474 vs .405
2014	M. Moore (23.9)	R. Brunson (8.2)	L. Whalen (5.5)	81.6 vs 77.2	35.2 vs 32.6	.467 vs .423
2015	M. Moore (20.6)	S. Fowles (8.3)	L. Whalen (4.2)	75.5 vs 71.7	35.3 vs 33.1	.441 vs .414
2016	M. Moore (19.3)	S. Fowles (8.5)	M. Moore (4.2)	85.8 vs 77.0	35.8 vs 30.7	.471 vs .417
2017	S. Fowles (18.9)	S. Fowles (10.4)	L. Whalen (4.1)	85.4 vs 74.2	35.2 vs 30.2	.478 vs .424
2018	M. Moore (18.0)	S. Fowles (11.9)	D. Robinson (3.3)	78.9 vs 78.3	35.3 vs 31.1	.451 vs .445
2019	O. Sims (14.5)	S. Fowles (8.9)	O. Sims (5.4)	78.4 vs 75.9	34.0 vs 31.1	.451 vs .434

2020s

Season	Individual			Team vs Opponents		
Season	PPG	RPG	APG	PPG	RPG	FG%
2020	C. Dangerfield (16.2)	S. Fowles (9.7)	C. Dangerfield (3.6)	84.4 vs 80.6	34.4 vs 30.9	.456 vs .447
2021	N. Collier (16.2)	S. Fowles (10.1)	L. Clarendon (5.7)	82.7 vs 78.7	34.9 vs 32.5	.458 vs .424
2022	S. Fowles & A. Powers (14.4)	S. Fowles (9.8)	M. Jefferson (4.9)	82.4 vs 83.9	36.9 vs 32.4	.450 vs .439
2023	N. Collier (21.5)	N. Collier (8.5)	L. Allen (4.5)	80.2 vs 85.0	34.3 vs 35.2	.435 vs .446
2024	N. Collier (20.4)	N. Collier (9.7)	C. Williams (5.5)	82.0 vs 75.6	34.3 vs 35.3	.448 vs .410
2025	N. Collier (23.0)	N. Collier (7.4)	C. Williams (6.2)	86.1 vs 76.7	34.2 vs 33.3	.472 vs .423

== Media coverage ==
Lynx games are broadcast on FanDuel Sports Network North. Broadcasters for the Lynx television games are Marney Gellner and Lea B. Olsen. Lynx games are carried on KFAN, and Wendell Epps broadcasts radio games (and iHeartRadio feeds). Beginning in 2025, 4 Lynx games are simulcast on NBC affiliate KARE.

Some Lynx games are broadcast nationally on ESPN, ESPN2, Ion Television(KPXM-TV), CBS(WCCO-TV), ABC(KSTP-TV), NBC (KARE), USA, Amazon Prime Video, NBCSN, and NBA TV.

== All-time notes ==
=== Regular season attendance ===
- A sellout for a basketball game at Target Center is 18,798.
- A sellout for a basketball game at Xcel Energy Center is 17,954.

Regular season all-time attendance
Year	Average	High	Low	Sellouts	Total for year	WNBA game average
1999	10,494 (5th)	14,171	8,457	0	167,901	10,207
2000	7,290 (12th)	8,622	5,816	0	116,638	9,074
2001	7,538 (11th)	10,489	5,168	0	120,607	9,075
2002	7,819 (11th)	12,544	5,087	0	125,110	9,228
2003	7,074 (12th)	12,747	5,113	0	120,253	8,800
2004	7,418 (11th)	16,227	4,122	0	126,108	8,613
2005	6,673 (12th)	12,891	4,190	0	113,447	8,172
2006	6,442 (12th)	14,793	4,704	0	109,522	7,476
2007	6,971 (12th)	13,004	4,891	0	118,513	7,742
2008	7,057 (12th)	12,276	4,765	0	119,972	7,948
2009	7,537 (9th)	11,245	5,620	0	128,127	8,039
2010	7,622 (8th)	12,311	5,954	0	129,582	7,834
2011	8,447 (6th)	11,820	7,117	0	143,607	7,954
2012	9,683 (2nd)	15,318	7,832	0	164,617	7,453
2013	9,381 (2nd)	16,404	7,913	0	159,483	7,531
2014	9,333 (2nd)	16,413	7,622	0	158,656	7,578
2015	9,364 (2nd)	17,414	7,523	0	159,189	7,184
2016	9,266 (4th)	16,132	7,207	0	157,523	7,655
2017	10,407 (2nd)	17,834	8,033	0	176,919	7,716
2018	10,036 (2nd)	17,933	7,834	0	170,620	6,721
2019	9,069 (3rd)	17,943	8,001	0	154,179	6,535
2020	Due to the COVID-19 pandemic, the season was played in Bradenton, Florida without fans.					
2021	2,696 (5th)	3,634	1,934	0	43,139	2,636
2022	7,444 (3rd)	12,134	5,044	0	133,988	5,679
2023	7,777 (4th)	13,531	6,525	0	155,539	6,615
2024	9,292 (7th)	19,023	7,010	2	185,832	9,807
2025	9,958 (8th)	16,421	7,808	0	219,068	10,986

=== Arenas ===
- Target Center 1999–2016, 2018–present
- Williams Arena 2007 one regular season game, 2017 playoffs
- Xcel Energy Center 2016 Semi-final playoffs, 2017 regular season

=== Draft picks ===
- 1999 Expansion Draft: Brandy Reed (1), Kim Williams (3), Octavia Blue (5), Adia Barnes (7)
- 1999: Tonya Edwards (7), Trisha Fallon (19), Andrea Lloyd (31), Sonja Tate (43), Angie Potthoff (49)
- 2000: Grace Daley (5), Betty Lennox (6), Maylana Martin (10), Marla Brumfield (22), Keitha Dickerson (24), Phylesha Whaley (38), Jana Lichnerova (54), Shanele Stires (56)
- 2001: Svetlana Abrosimova (7), Erin Buescher (23), Tombi Bell (39), Megan Taylor (55)
- 2002: Tamika Williams (6), Lindsey Meder (38), Shárron Francis (54)
- 2003 Miami/Portland Dispersal Draft: Sheri Sam (2)
- 2003: Teresa Edwards (14), Carla Bennett (29)
- 2004 Cleveland Dispersal Draft: Helen Darling (7)
- 2004: Nicole Ohlde (6), Vanessa Hayden (7), Tasha Butts (20), Amber Jacobs (33)
- 2005: Kristen Mann (11), Jacqueline Batteast (17), Monique Bivins (37)
- 2006: Seimone Augustus (1), Shona Thorburn (7), Megan Duffy (31)
- 2007 Charlotte Dispersal Draft: Tangela Smith (2)
- 2007: Noelle Quinn (4), Eshaya Murphy (15), Brooke Smith (23), Kathrin Ress (24)
- 2008: Candice Wiggins (3), Nicky Anosike (16), Charde Houston (30)
- 2009 Houston Dispersal Draft: Roneeka Hodges (4)
- 2009: Renee Montgomery (4), Quanitra Hollingsworth (9), Rashanda McCants (15), Emily Fox (30)
- 2010 Sacramento Dispersal Draft: Rebekkah Brunson (2)
- 2010: Monica Wright (2), Kelsey Griffin (3), Gabriela Marginean (26)
- 2011: Maya Moore (1), Amber Harris (4), Jessica Breland (13), Kachine Alexander (26)
- 2012: Devereaux Peters (3), Damiris Dantas (12), Julie Wojta (18), Kayla Steindl (19), Nika Baric (20), Jacki Gemelos (31)
- 2013: Lindsey Moore (12), Sugar Rodgers (14), Chucky Jeffery (24), Waltiea Rolle (36)
- 2014: Tricia Liston (12), Asya Bussie (15), Christina Foggie (24), Asia Taylor (36)
- 2015: Reshanda Gray (16), Shae Kelley (35)
- 2016: Jazmon Gwathmey (14), Bashaara Graves (22), Temi Fagbenle (35)
- 2017: Alexis Jones (12), Lisa Berkani (24), Tahlia Tupaea (36)
- 2018: Ji-su Park (17), Kahlia Lawrence (24), Carlie Wagner (36)
- 2019: Napheesa Collier (6), Jessica Shepard (16), Natisha Hiedeman (18), Cierra Dillard (20), Kenisha Bell (30)
- 2020: Mikiah Herbert Harrigan (6), Crystal Dangerfield (16)
- 2021: Rennia Davis (9)
- 2022: Kayla Jones (22), Hannah Sjerven (28)
- 2023: Diamond Miller (2), Maïa Hirsch (12), Dorka Juhász (16), Brea Beal (24), Taylor Soule (28)
- 2024: Alissa Pili (8), Kiki Jefferson (31)
- 2025: Anastasiia Kosu (15), Dalayah Daniels (24), Aubrey Griffin (37)
- 2026: Olivia Miles (2), Lani White (45)

=== All-Stars ===
- 1999: Tonya Edwards
- 2000: Betty Lennox, Katie Smith
- 2001: Katie Smith
- 2002: Katie Smith
- 2003: Katie Smith
- 2004: Katie Smith
- 2005: Katie Smith
- 2006: Seimone Augustus
- 2007: Seimone Augustus
- 2008: No All-Star Game
- 2009: Nicky Anosike, Charde Houston
- 2010: Rebekkah Brunson, Lindsay Whalen
- 2011: Seimone Augustus, Rebekkah Brunson, Maya Moore, Lindsay Whalen
- 2012: No All-Star Game
- 2013: Seimone Augustus, Rebekkah Brunson, Maya Moore, Lindsay Whalen
- 2014: Seimone Augustus, Maya Moore, Lindsay Whalen
- 2015: Seimone Augustus, Maya Moore, Lindsay Whalen
- 2016: No All-Star Game
- 2017: Seimone Augustus, Rebekkah Brunson, Sylvia Fowles, Maya Moore
- 2018: Seimone Augustus, Rebekkah Brunson, Sylvia Fowles, Maya Moore
- 2019: Napheesa Collier, Sylvia Fowles, Odyssey Sims
- 2020: No All-Star Game
- 2021: Napheesa Collier, Sylvia Fowles
- 2022: Sylvia Fowles
- 2023: Napheesa Collier
- 2024: Napheesa Collier, Kayla McBride
- 2025: Napheesa Collier, Kayla McBride, Courtney Williams
- 2026: Natasha Howard, Olivia Miles, Courtney Williams

=== Olympians ===
- 2000: Katie Smith, Kristi Harrower (AUS), Annie La Fleur (AUS)
- 2004: Katie Smith, Kristi Harrower (AUS), Nuria Martinez (ESP)
- 2008: Seimone Augustus, Nuria Martinez (ESP)
- 2012: Seimone Augustus, Maya Moore, Lindsay Whalen, Rachel Jarry (AUS), Damiris Dantas (BRA)
- 2016: Anna Cruz (ESP), Seimone Augustus, Sylvia Fowles, Maya Moore, Lindsay Whalen, Rachel Jarry (AUS)
- 2020: Napheesa Collier, Sylvia Fowles, Bridget Carleton (CAN), Natalie Achonwa (CAN)
- 2024: Napheesa Collier, Alanna Smith (AUS), Bridget Carleton (CAN)

=== Honors and awards ===
- 2000 Rookie of the Year: Betty Lennox
- 2000 All-WNBA Second Team: Katie Smith
- 2000 All-WNBA Second Team: Betty Lennox
- 2001 All-WNBA First Team: Katie Smith
- 2002 All-WNBA Second Team: Katie Smith
- 2003 All-WNBA First Team: Katie Smith
- 2004 Coach of the Year: Suzie McConnell Serio
- 2004 Kim Perrot Sportsmanship Award: Teresa Edwards
- 2006 Rookie of the Year: Seimone Augustus
- 2006 All-WNBA Second Team: Seimone Augustus
- 2006 All-Rookie Team: Seimone Augustus
- 2007 All-WNBA Second Team: Seimone Augustus
- 2008 Sixth Woman of the Year: Candice Wiggins
- 2008 All-Rookie Team: Nicky Anosike
- 2008 All-Rookie Team: Candice Wiggins
- 2009 All-Defensive First Team: Nicky Anosike
- 2009 All-Rookie Team: Renee Montgomery
- 2010 All-Defensive Second Team: Rebekkah Brunson
- 2010 All-Rookie Team: Monica Wright
- 2011 WNBA Finals Most Valuable Player: Seimone Augustus
- 2011 Rookie of the Year: Maya Moore
- 2011 Coach of the Year: Cheryl Reeve
- 2011 All-WNBA First Team: Lindsay Whalen
- 2011 All-WNBA Second Team: Seimone Augustus
- 2011 Peak Performer (Assists): Lindsay Whalen
- 2011 All-Defensive First Team: Rebekkah Brunson
- 2011 All-Rookie Team: Maya Moore
- 2012 Peak Performer (Assists): Lindsay Whalen
- 2012 All-WNBA First Team: Seimone Augustus
- 2012 All-WNBA Second Team: Lindsay Whalen
- 2012 All-WNBA Second Team: Maya Moore
- 2013 WNBA Finals Most Valuable Player: Maya Moore
- 2013 All-WNBA First Team: Maya Moore
- 2013 All-WNBA First Team: Lindsay Whalen
- 2013 All-WNBA Second Team: Seimone Augustus
- 2013 All-Defensive Second Team: Rebekkah Brunson
- 2014 Most Valuable Player: Maya Moore
- 2014 Peak Performer (Points): Maya Moore
- 2014 All-WNBA First Team: Maya Moore
- 2014 All-WNBA Second Team: Seimone Augustus
- 2014 All-WNBA Second Team: Lindsay Whalen
- 2014 All-Defensive Second Team: Maya Moore
- 2015 WNBA Finals Most Valuable Player: Sylvia Fowles
- 2015 All-WNBA First Team: Maya Moore
- 2016 Defensive Player of the Year: Sylvia Fowles
- 2016 Coach of the Year: Cheryl Reeve
- 2016 All-WNBA First Team: Maya Moore
- 2016 All-WNBA Second Team: Sylvia Fowles
- 2016 All-Defensive First Team: Sylvia Fowles
- 2017 Most Valuable Player: Sylvia Fowles
- 2017 All-WNBA First Team: Sylvia Fowles
- 2017 All-WNBA First Team: Maya Moore
- 2017 All-Defensive First Team: Sylvia Fowles
- 2017 All-Defensive Second Team: Rebekkah Brunson
- 2017 All-Defensive Second Team: Maya Moore
- 2017 WNBA Finals Most Valuable Player: Sylvia Fowles
- 2018 All-WNBA Second Team: Maya Moore
- 2018 All-Defensive Second Team: Rebekkah Brunson
- 2018 All-Defensive Second Team: Sylvia Fowles
- 2018 Peak Performer (Rebounds): Sylvia Fowles
- 2019 Rookie of the Year: Napheesa Collier
- 2019 All-WNBA Second Team: Odyssey Sims
- 2019 All-Rookie Team: Napheesa Collier
- 2019 Executive of the Year: Cheryl Reeve
- 2020 Rookie of the Year: Crystal Dangerfield
- 2020 Coach of the Year: Cheryl Reeve
- 2020 All-Rookie Team: Crystal Dangerfield
- 2020 All-WNBA Second Team: Napheesa Collier
- 2020 All-Defensive Second Team: Napheesa Collier
- 2021 Defensive Player of the Year: Sylvia Fowles
- 2021 All-Defensive First Team: Sylvia Fowles
- 2021 All-WNBA Second Team: Sylvia Fowles
- 2022 Peak Performer (Rebounds): Sylvia Fowles
- 2022 Kim Perrot Sportsmanship Award: Sylvia Fowles
- 2022 All-Defensive First Team: Sylvia Fowles
- 2022 All-WNBA Second Team: Sylvia Fowles
- 2023 All-Rookie Team: Diamond Miller
- 2023 All-Rookie Team: Dorka Juhász
- 2023 All-WNBA First Team: Napheesa Collier
- 2024 Defensive Player of the Year: Napheesa Collier
- 2024 All-Defensive First Team: Napheesa Collier
- 2024 All-Defensive Second Team: Alanna Smith
- 2024 Coach of the Year: Cheryl Reeve
- 2024 Executive of the Year: Cheryl Reeve
- 2025 All-WNBA First Team: Napheesa Collier
- 2025 Defensive Player of the Year: Alanna Smith
- 2025 All-Defensive First Team: Napheesa Collier
- 2026 Rookie of the Year: Olivia Miles
- 2026 Coach of the Year: Cheryl Reeve
- 2026 Executive of the Year: Cheryl Reeve

=== Sylvia Fowles Altruism Award ===
- 2023: Napheesa Collier
- 2024: Bridget Carleton
- 2025: Natisha Hiedeman
- 2026: Maya Caldwell

== Notes ==
Sporting positions
Preceded by Seattle Storm	WNBA Champions; 2011 (First title)	Succeeded by Indiana Fever
Preceded by Indiana Fever	WNBA Champions; 2013 (Second title)	Succeeded by Phoenix Mercury
Preceded by Seattle Storm	WNBA Western Conference Champions; 2011 (First title); 2012 (Second title); 2013 (Third title)	Succeeded by Phoenix Mercury
Preceded by Phoenix Mercury	WNBA Champions; 2015 (Third title)	Succeeded by Los Angeles Sparks
Preceded by Phoenix Mercury	WNBA Western Conference Champions; 2016 (Fifth title); 2017 (Sixth title)	Succeeded by Seattle Storm
Preceded by Los Angeles Sparks	WNBA Champions; 2017 (Fourth title)	Succeeded by Seattle Storm
Preceded by New York Liberty	WNBA Commissioner's Cup Champions; 2024 (First title)	Succeeded by Incumbent
