= 2006 Minnesota Lynx season =

- Head coach: Suzie McConnell-Serio (until July 23); Carolyn Jenkins (after July 23)
- Arena: Target Center

Results
- Record: 10–24 (.294)
- Place: 7th (Western)
- Playoff finish: Did not qualify

The 2006 Minnesota Lynx season was the 8th season for the Minnesota Lynx of the Women's National Basketball Association, and the fourth and final season under head coach Suzie McConnell-Serio.

The season tipped-off on Friday, May 23, 2006, at home against the Connecticut Sun. After the departure of Katie Smith, The Lynx failed to improve on their 14–20 record from the 2005 season, finishing with a franchise worst record of 10 wins and 24 losses and finished in last place in the division for the first time since 2002.

== Offseason ==
=== Expansion draft ===
Stacey Lovelace-Tolbert was selected by the Chicago Sky in the draft.

== Draft ==
Round	Pick	Player	Position	Nationality	College/Club	Outcome	Ref.
1	1	Seimone Augustus	G	United States	LSU	Signed rookie contract	
1	7	Shona Thorburn	G	England	Utah	Signed rookie contract	
3	31	Megan Duffy	G	United States	Notre Dame	Signed rookie contract	

=== Trades ===
April
April 5	To Minnesota Lynx Ambrosia Anderson and 2007 2nd round pick	To Detroit Shock Jacqueline Batteast and 2007 3rd round pick

== Regular season ==
=== Season standings ===
Western Conference	W	L	PCT	GB	Home	Road	Conf.
Los Angeles Sparks ^{x}	25	9	.735	–	15–2	10–7	15–5
Sacramento Monarchs ^{x}	21	13	.618	4.0	14–3	7–10	10–10
Houston Comets ^{x}	18	16	.529	7.0	12–5	6–11	11–9
Seattle Storm ^{x}	18	16	.529	7.0	9–8	9–8	10–10
Phoenix Mercury ^{o}	18	16	.529	7.0	10–7	8–9	8–12
San Antonio Silver Stars ^{o}	13	21	.382	12.0	6–11	7–10	10–10
Minnesota Lynx ^{o}	10	24	.294	15.0	8–9	2–15	6–14

=== Season schedule ===
Date	Opponent	Score	Result	Record
May 23	Connecticut	69-81	Loss	0-1
May 24	@ Detroit	69-78	Loss	0-2
May 27	@ Washington	75-90	Loss	0-3
May 31	Los Angeles	114-71	Win	1-3
June 2	Indiana	92-87	Win	2-3
June 4	@ Houston	62-85	Loss	2-4
June 9	@ San Antonio	86-79	Win	3-4
June 11	Houston	75-62	Win	4-4
June 14	Seattle	66-74	Loss	4-5
June 16	@ San Antonio	60-90	Loss	4-6
June 18	Phoenix	94-82	Win	5-6
June 22	@ Connecticut	62-79	Loss	5-7
June 24	New York	83-93	Loss	5-8
June 28	@ Phoenix	78-81	Loss	5-9
June 29	@ Sacramento	78-87	Loss	5-10
July 1	@ Seattle	75-92	Loss	5-11
July 5	Washington	84-74	Win	6-11
July 7	Detroit	80-92	Loss	6-12
July 9	San Antonio	85-80	Win	7-12
July 16	Los Angeles	78-90	Loss	7-13
July 19	Chicago	90-82	Win	8-13
July 20	@ Houston	55-78	Loss	8-14
July 22	Sacramento	59-86	Loss	8-15
July 25	@ Charlotte	70-62	Win	9-15
July 27	Charlotte	68-81	Loss	9-16
July 28	@ Chicago	65-79	Loss	9-17
July 30	@ New York	69-78	Loss	9-18
August 1	Seattle	75-77	Loss	9-19
August 3	@ Indiana	59-69	Loss	9-20
August 4	Houston	73-77 (OT)	Loss	9-21
August 6	San Antonio	82-68	Win	10-21
August 8	@ Phoenix	68-99	Loss	10-22
August 10	@ Sacramento	66-74	Loss	10-23
August 13	@ Los Angeles	59-78	Loss	10-24

== Statistics ==
Legend
GP	Games played	GS	Games started	MPG	Minutes per game	RPG	Rebounds per game
APG	Assists per game	SPG	Steals per game	BPG	Blocks per game	PPG	Points per game
FG%	Field-goal percentage	3P%	3-point field-goal percentage	FT%	Free-throw percentage	TO	Turnovers per game
PF	Fouls per game		Team leader		League leader

== Player stats ==
Player	Games played	Rebounds	Assists	Steals	Block	Points
Seimone Augustus	34	128	50	21	18	744
Nicole Ohlde	34	190	54	20	25	327
Amber Jacobs	34	90	115	26	2	279
Svetlana Abrosimova	34	106	54	34	1	263
Kristen Mann	33	113	94	19	7	245
Vanessa Hayden	33	115	19	6	44	177
Adrian Williams	32	149	8	25	8	157
Tamika Williams	31	174	21	16	1	147
Megan Duffy	31	29	36	9	0	105
Tynesha Lewis	19	27	18	12	5	46
Chandi Jones	6	5	3	1	0	17
Shona Thorburn	22	18	19	4	2	16
