= 2005 Minnesota Lynx season =

- Head coach: Suzie McConnell Serio
- Arena: Target Center

Results
- Record: 14–20 (.412)
- Place: 6th (Western)
- Playoff finish: Did not qualify

The 2005 Minnesota Lynx season was the 7th season for the Minnesota Lynx of the Women's National Basketball Association, and the third season under head coach Suzie McConnell Serio.

The season tipped-off on Sunday, May 22, 2005, in Houston against the Houston Comets. The Lynx missed the playoffs for the first time since 2002. It also marked the final season for original franchise superstar Katie Smith, as she was traded to the Detroit Shock during the season.

== Offseason ==
=== WNBA draft ===
Round	Pick	Player	Nationality	School/Club team
1	11	Kristen Mann (F)	United States	UC-Santa Barbara
2	17	Jacqueline Batteast (F)	United States	Notre Dame
3	37	Monique Bivins (G)	United States	Alabama

== Regular season ==
=== Season standings ===
Western Conference	W	L	PCT	GB	Home	Road	Conf.
Sacramento Monarchs ^{x}	25	9	.735	–	15–2	10–7	17–5
Seattle Storm ^{x}	20	14	.588	5.0	14–3	6–11	13–9
Houston Comets ^{x}	19	15	.559	6.0	11–6	8–9	11–11
Los Angeles Sparks ^{x}	17	17	.500	8.0	11–6	6–11	12–10
Phoenix Mercury ^{o}	16	18	.471	9.0	11–6	5–12	12–10
Minnesota Lynx ^{o}	14	20	.412	11.0	11–6	3–14	9–13
San Antonio Silver Stars ^{o}	7	27	.206	18.0	5–12	2–15	3–19

=== Season schedule ===
Date	Opponent	Score	Result	Record
May 22	@ Houston	65-79	Loss	0-1
May 25	Los Angeles	68-65	Win	1-1
May 29	Sacramento	66-67	Loss	1-2
June 3	@ Washington	71-74	Loss	1-3
June 4	Charlotte	73-67	Win	2-3
June 7	@ Houston	62-58	Win	3-3
June 11	Washington	78-60	Win	4-3
June 15	@ Seattle	86-81 (OT)	Win	5-3
June 17	@ Sacramento	50-67	Loss	5-4
June 18	@ Los Angeles	56-69	Loss	5-5
June 22	Phoenix	75-59	Win	6-5
June 24	@ Indiana	55-57	Loss	6-6
June 26	Seattle	73-70	Win	7-6
June 28	San Antonio	63-53	Win	8-6
June 30	@ Connecticut	56-71	Loss	8-7
July 7	@ Charlotte	58-66	Loss	8-8
July 13	Detroit	71-61	Win	9-8
July 15	@ New York	64-60	Win	10-8
July 17	Connecticut	53-72	Loss	10-9
July 19	Indiana	66-45	Win	11-9
July 24	New York	47-59	Loss	11-10
July 26	@ San Antonio	71-78	Loss	11-11
July 29	Phoenix	65-69	Loss	11-12
July 31	@ Sacramento	54-67	Loss	11-13
August 3	@ Phoenix	64-70	Loss	11-14
August 7	Los Angeles	76-72	Win	12-14
August 9	San Antonio	76-72	Win	13-14
August 11	@ Detroit	66-72 (OT)	Loss	13-15
August 12	Seattle	66-72	Loss	13-16
August 16	Houston	73-62	Win	14-16
August 18	@ Seattle	60-76	Loss	14-17
August 21	@ Phoenix	69-83	Loss	14-18
August 23	@ Los Angeles	63-74	Loss	14-19
August 27	Sacramento	52-61	Loss	14-20

== Player stats ==
Player	Games played	Rebounds	Assists	Steals	Block	Points
Nicole Ohlde	34	194	78	21	22	382
Katie Smith	23	55	61	25	2	306
Svetlana Abrosimova	31	107	60	48	6	304
Vanessa Hayden	31	163	23	15	68	246
Stacey Lovelace	34	107	31	24	11	209
Tamika Raymond	34	171	39	30	2	197
Kristi Harrower	34	82	96	38	1	156
Amber Jacobs	33	19	68	19	4	121
Amanda Lassiter	31	46	23	14	4	107
Chandi Jones	10	33	30	13	3	81
Kristen Mann	24	35	11	8	1	71
Tynesha Lewis	11	5	7	3	1	28
Susan King Borchardt	3	1	1	0	1	3
Jacqueline Batteast	8	5	3	0	1	0
Nuria Martinez	1	0	0	0	0	0
Stacey Thomas	1	2	0	0	0	0
