= Don Zierden =

American basketball coach

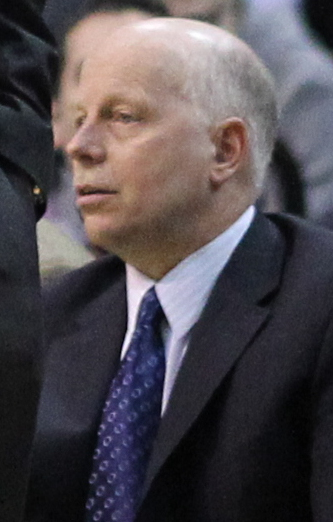

Personal information
- Born: September 27, 1958 (age 68) Minneapolis, Minnesota, U.S.

Career information
- High school: DeLaSalle (Minneapolis, Minnesota)
- College: Mount Senario (1977–1981)
- Coaching career: 1984–2016

Career history

Coaching
- 1984–1986: DeLaSalle HS
- 1986–1988: Tulsa (assistant)
- 1990–1994: La Crosse Catbirds (assistant)
- 1994–1995: Pittsburgh Piranhas
- 1996–1998: La Crosse Bobcats
- 2000–2005: Minnesota Timberwolves (assistant)
- 2005–2007: Detroit Pistons (assistant)
- 2006–2009: Minnesota Lynx
- 2009–2016: Washington Wizards (assistant)

Career highlights
- As Assistant Coach: 2× CBA champion (1990, 1992); American Athletic Conference champion (1986)

Donald Casper Zierden Jr. (born September 27, 1958) is an American basketball coach. From 2007 to 2009, Zierden served as the head coach of the Minnesota Lynx in the Women's National Basketball Association (WNBA).

== Early life and education ==
Zierden, a Minneapolis native, graduated from DeLaSalle High School in Minneapolis and later from Mount Senario College in Ladysmith, Wisconsin in 1981.

== Coaching career ==
He returned to DeLaSalle High in 1984 to become head varsity basketball coach and led DeLaSalle to the Minnesota Class A title in his first season. In two seasons at DeLaSalle, Zierden had a 61–14 record as head coach.

In 1986, Zierden moved to the collegiate ranks to be an assistant coach at the University of Tulsa under J. D. Barnett. After two seasons at Tulsa, Zierden left coaching to work at a steel company. Zierden returned to coaching in 1990, as he became an assistant coach for the La Crosse Catbirds of the Continental Basketball Association under Flip Saunders. In four seasons, the duo had a 139–85 record, including the 1992 CBA championship. In the 1994–95 season, Zierden became an assistant coach of the Pittsburgh Piranhas of the CBA, again, alongside Flip Saunders. They lead the team to a 27–29 record and CBA Finals appearance.

Zierden got his first NBA job in 1999 as video coordinator for the Minnesota Timberwolves, and he would be promoted to assistant coach the following year and remain for five seasons on the staffs of Flip Saunders (replaced by interim coach Kevin McHale in early 2005). From 2005 to 2007, Zierden was an assistant coach for the Detroit Pistons.

Zierden became the Minnesota Lynx's fifth head coach on December 13, 2006, replacing Carolyn Jenkins, who remained on the staff as an assistant.

In 2007, Zierden's Lynx began the season 0–7, lost 10 straight in July and failed to get into the playoff race. They finished tied with a league worst 10–24 record.

On June 2, 2009, Zierden resigned as head coach of the Lynx, four days before the season began.

He accepted an assistant coaching job under Flip Saunders in Washington in 2009.

== Head coaching record ==
Team	Year	G	W	L	W–L%	Finish	PG	PW	PL	PW–L%	Result
Minnesota	2007	34	10	24	.294	6th in Western	—	—	—	—	Missed playoffs
Minnesota	2008	34	16	18	.471	7th in Western	—	—	—	—	Missed playoffs
Career		68	26	42	.382		—	—	—	—	

== Quotes ==
- “With our team, I thought we would shoot the basketball a little better. I thought we would defend a little better at times. Those have been the biggest surprises and disappointments." — Zierden on the 2007 Lynx
- “She has been utterly fantastic. She has taken fewer shots this year and her numbers are up across the board. We told her coming in that we needed her to take fewer shots because we needed more balance to be a successful team, and she's been great about that. Any success this team is going to have down the road, she is going to be a big part of it." — Zierden on Seimone Augustus
- “I miss the charter flights, the huge per diem and the huge salary. That's what I miss (laughs). I don't miss the 82-game schedule, where you are flying all over the place and really missing out on your family." — Zierden on the NBA vs. WNBA
