= Cheryl Reeve =

American basketball coach (born 1966)

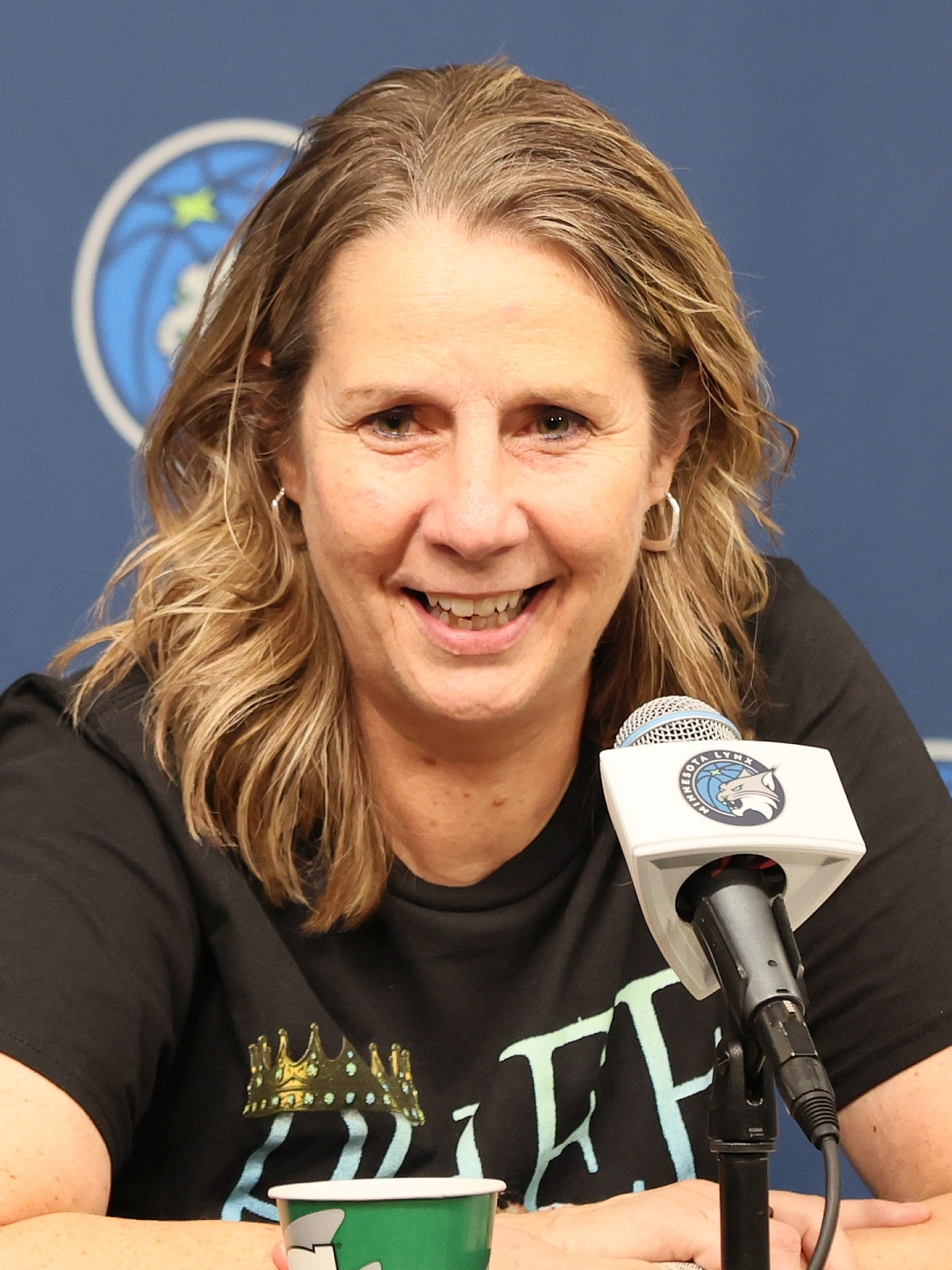
- Reeve in 2026

Minnesota Lynx
- Positions: Head coach, President of Basketball Operations
- League: WNBA

Personal information
- Born: September 20, 1966 (age 60) Omaha, Nebraska, U.S.

Career information
- High school: Washington Township (Sewell, New Jersey)
- College: La Salle (1984–1988)
- Coaching career: 1988–present

Career history
- 1988–1990: La Salle (assistant)
- 1990–1995: George Washington (assistant)
- 1995–2000: Indiana State
- 2001–2002: Charlotte Sting (assistant)
- 2003: Cleveland Rockers (assistant)
- 2004–2005: Charlotte Sting (assistant)
- 2006–2009: Detroit Shock (assistant)
- 2010–present: Minnesota Lynx

Career highlights
- As head coach: 5× WNBA Coach of the Year (2011, 2016, 2020, 2024, 2026); 4× WNBA champion (2011, 2013, 2015, 2017); WNBA Commissioner's Cup Champion (2024); 6× WNBA All-Star Game coach (2013, 2014, 2017, 2024-2026); 3× WNBA Basketball Executive of the Year (2019, 2024, 2026); 2× AP WNBA Coach of the Year (2020, 2024); As assistant coach: 2× WNBA champion (2006, 2008)
- Women's Basketball Hall of Fame
Medals
Head coach for the United States
Olympic Games
Gold medal – first place	2024 Paris	Team
FIBA Women's Basketball World Cup
Gold medal – first place	2022 Australia

Cheryl Ann Reeve (born September 20, 1966) is an American basketball head coach and President of Basketball Operations for the Minnesota Lynx of the WNBA. Reeve has coached the Lynx to four league championships. In WNBA history, she is first in career wins including regular season and postseason, is first in career regular season wins, and is first in career postseason wins as a coach. Reeve was named the WNBA Coach of the Year in 2011, 2016, 2020, 2024 and 2026 and WNBA Basketball Executive of the Year in 2019, 2024, and 2026. She is the first coach in WNBA history to be named Coach of the Year five times. She is also the first person to win both Coach of the Year and Executive of the Year in the same season twice (2024 and 2026). She was inducted into the Women's Basketball Hall of Fame in June 2026.

== Early life and education ==
Cheryl Reeve was born in Omaha, Nebraska, on September 20, 1966. Reeve grew up in Washington Township, Gloucester County, New Jersey and graduated from Washington Township High School in 1984, where she was part of the school's first team to make the state finals. In 1988, Reeve was a Rhodes Scholar nominee and received a MAAC Scholar-Athlete Post Graduate Award and an NCAA Post-Graduate Scholarship. She earned a bachelor's degree in computer science that year and then an MBA, both from La Salle University.

== Coaching career ==
Reeve started out as assistant coach at her alma mater, La Salle for two years. She was then an assistant at George Washington for five years. The Colonials posted five 20-win seasons, captured three Atlantic 10 Conference Championships and appeared in four NCAA tournaments during Reeve's stint at George Washington. Her first head coaching position was with the Indiana State Sycamores from 1995 to December 1 of the 2000–2001 season (replaced by her assistant coach Jim Wiedie). She improved the team's record each year for the first four seasons, and led the squad to its first postseason berth in 20 years following the 1998–1999 campaign. She is tied with Kay Riek for 5th in Lady Sycamore Wins.

=== WNBA career ===
==== Assistant coach roles ====
Reeve got her start in the WNBA with the Charlotte Sting in 2001 when she joined Anne Donovan’s staff as an assistant. After posting an 8–24 record the year previous, Charlotte turned things around in Reeve’s first year by going 18–14 and advancing to the WNBA Finals. They followed in 2002, with another 18–14 mark and their second straight appearance in the postseason.

Following the 2002 campaign, Donovan left to become the head coach of the Seattle Storm, and Dan Hughes and the Cleveland Rockers hired Reeve away from Charlotte. The Rockers advanced to the playoffs that year, but in the offseason ownership decided to cease operation of the team making Reeve a coaching free agent. She rejoined the Sting staff for the 2004 and 2005 seasons. Reeve then spent four seasons as an assistant coach with the Detroit Shock, also serving as the team's last general manager before they moved to Tulsa.

==== Minnesota Lynx head coach ====
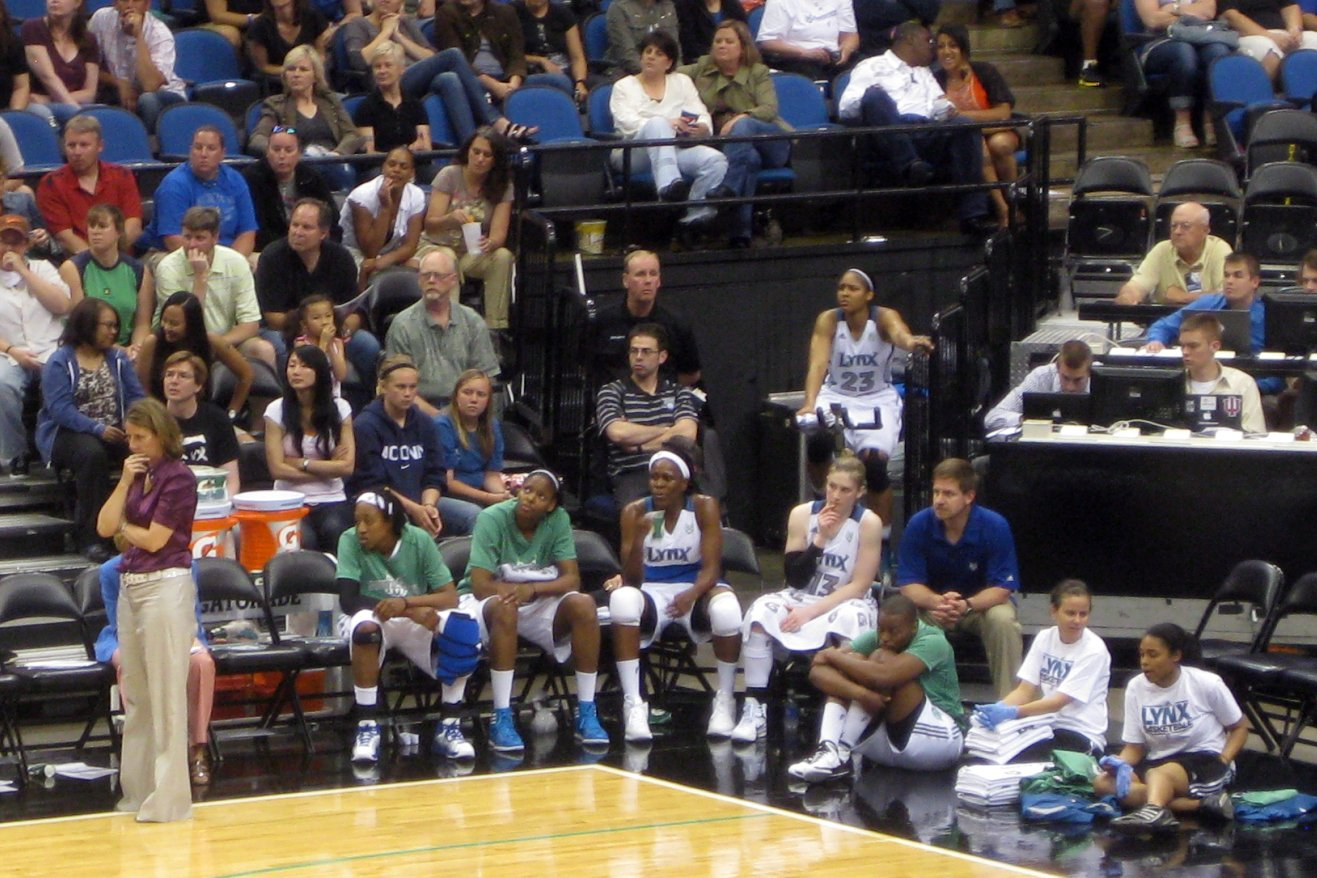
Reeve coaching the Lynx in 2011

Reeve was named the head coach of the Minnesota Lynx on December 8, 2009. In her first season, the Lynx went 13–21, missing the playoffs. The team was hampered by injuries to Candice Wiggins and Seimone Augustus. At one point, a frustrated Reeve said bluntly, "We are a bad basketball team. It starts at the top. I have not been able to get them to understand defensively what we need to get done and, clearly, our offense is one of the worst in the league."

The Lynx improved dramatically in 2011. With Wiggins and Augustus back healthy, and with the addition of rookie Maya Moore, the team got off to a quick start and did not falter throughout the regular season, finishing with a league-best 27–7 record. The dramatic turnaround earned Reeve the WNBA Coach of the Year Award in just her second year as a head coach at the professional level. The Lynx finished what they started, losing only one game in the playoffs en route to their first WNBA championship.

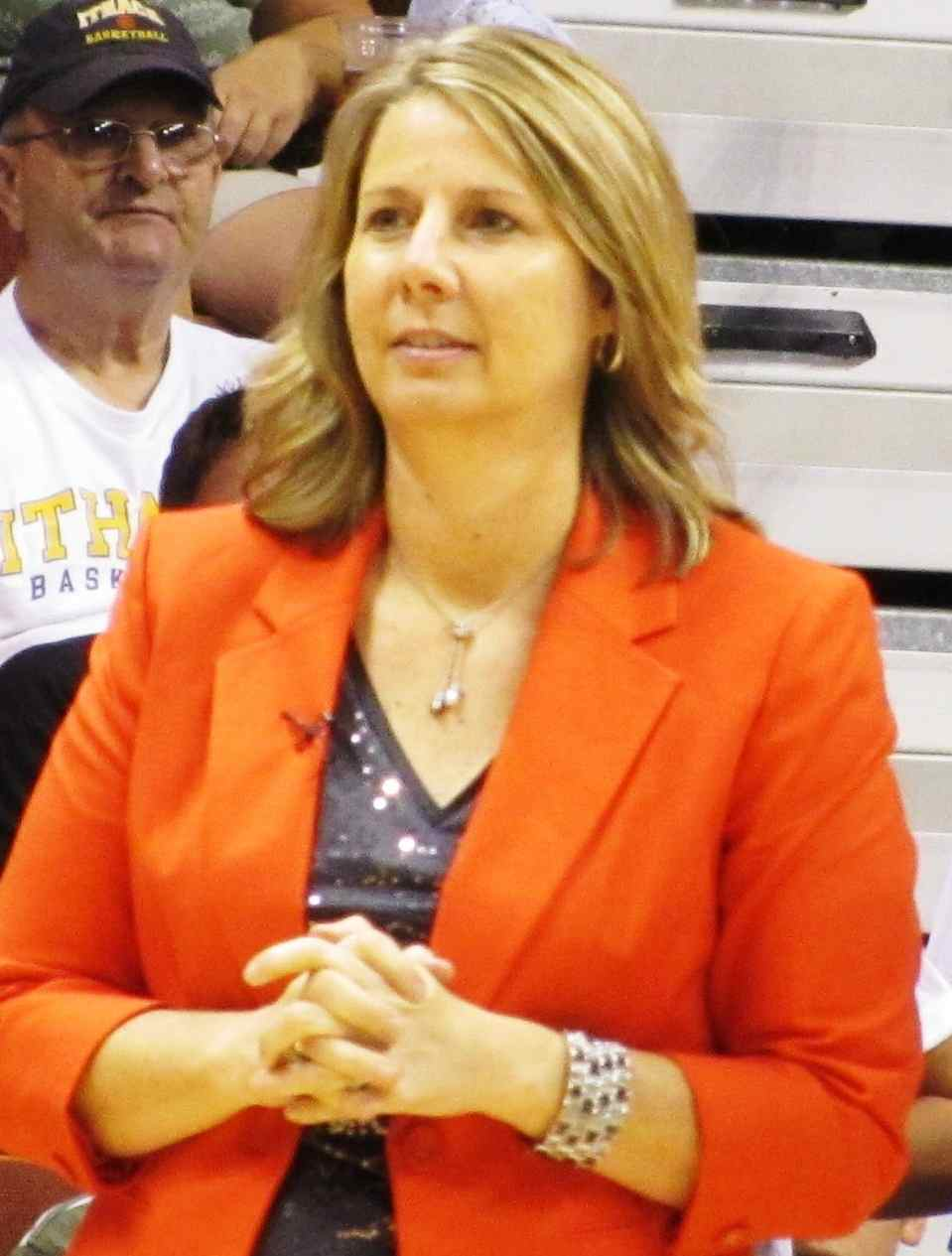
Reeve in 2013

Reeve took her team back to the playoffs in her third year. The team qualified for the playoffs after just 21 games, the fastest in franchise history. Reeve became the winningest coach in Lynx franchise history on August 26, 2012, with a win over the Atlanta Dream. The Lynx went on to lose to the Indiana Fever in the WNBA Finals.

In 2013, Reeve and her staff coached the WNBA Western Conference All-Star Team, as the Lynx had won the conference championship the previous year. Reeve's squad included four Lynx players: Seimone Augustus, Maya Moore, Rebekkah Brunson, and Lindsay Whalen. Reeve's team ended up winning the game, 102–98. Reeve's team then swept through the playoffs, going 7–0 en route to their second championship under her leadership.

Reeve is the most successful coach in franchise history, both in terms of the number of games won and winning percentage, and also has the highest winning percentage in WNBA history. She won her 100th regular season game on June 2, 2014, in a victory over the San Antonio Stars. She won her 31st postseason game on September 30, 2016, in a semi-final victory over the Phoenix Mercury, to move into first place in WNBA history in playoff wins.

In December 2017, Reeve was also promoted to the Lynx General Manager position. With her 2022 contract extension, Reeve was elevated from the general manager position to president of basketball operations.

Throughout her tenure, Reeve has won many accolades for her coaching. She was named WNBA Coach of the Year in 2011, 2016, 2020, 2024, and 2026. She was named the AP coach of the year in 2020 and 2024. Additionally, she was inducted into the Minnesota Sports Hall of Fame as part of the Class of 2023. She was inducted into the Women's Basketball Hall of Fame on June 27, 2026. On July 8, 2026, the Lynx win against the Connecticut Sun gave Reeve her record-setting 380th coaching win in the league, surpassing Mike Thibault. On July 9, 2026, she was announced as one of the All-Star head coaches for her fifth time.

=== USA Basketball ===
In the 2016 and 2020 games, Reeve served as an assistant coach on Team USA. In 2016, Geno Auriemma was the head coach, while Dawn Staley took over for the 2020 competition.

Before taking on her role among the assistant coaching staff, Reeve had served as an assistant for the 2014–16 USA National Team that took home gold medals at the 2014 FIBA World Cup Team and 2016 Olympic Games. She returned as an assistant for the 2018 World Cup Team, winning gold and qualifying the USA for the 2020 Olympics.

Reeve was named the head coach for the women's national team in December 2021. As head coach, she led the national team to its fourth World Cup with the October 2022 win. She was named USA Basketball's National Team Coach for the Year in 2022 following the World Cup win. The national team won its 8th Olympic gold medal in the final game against France on August 11, 2024, with Reeve as head coach.

== Personal life ==
Reeve is married to Lynx President of Business Operations Carley Knox. They married in 2011 after meeting each other when they both worked for the Detroit Shock. They have one child, Oliver, who Knox said has seen every Lynx home game since he was born.

== Coaching record ==
=== College ===
Record table
Season	Team	Overall	Conference	Standing	Postseason
Indiana State Sycamores (Missouri Valley Conference) (1995–2000)
1995–96	Indiana State	7–19	3–15	9th	
1996–97	Indiana State	14–13	9–9	T–4th	
1997–98	Indiana State	17–11	10–8	4th	
1998–99	Indiana State	18–11	10–8	4th	WNIT First Round
1999–00	Indiana State	9–18	5–13	T–7th	
2000–01	Indiana State	1–5	0–0		
Total:		66–77 (.462)			
National champion Postseason invitational champion Conference regular season champion Conference regular season and conference tournament champion Division regular season champion Division regular season and conference tournament champion Conference tournament champion

=== WNBA ===
Legend
Regular season	G	Games coached	W	Games won	L	Games lost	W–L %	Win–loss %
Playoffs	PG	Playoff games	PW	Playoff wins	PL	Playoff losses	PW–L %	Playoff win–loss %

Team	Year	G	W	L	W–L%	Finish	PG	PW	PL	PW–L%	Result
MIN	2010	34	13	21	.382	5th in West	—	—	—		Missed Playoffs
MIN	2011	34	27	7	.794	1st in West	8	7	1	.875	Won WNBA Finals
MIN	2012	34	27	7	.794	1st in West	9	5	4	.555	Lost WNBA Finals
MIN	2013	34	26	8	.765	1st in West	7	7	0	1.000	Won WNBA Finals
MIN	2014	34	25	9	.735	2nd in West	5	3	2	.600	Lost in Western Conference Finals
MIN	2015	34	22	12	.647	1st in West	10	7	3	.700	Won WNBA Finals
MIN	2016	34	28	6	.824	1st in West	8	5	3	.625	Lost in WNBA Finals
MIN	2017	34	27	7	.794	1st in West	8	6	2	.700	Won WNBA Finals
MIN	2018	34	18	16	.529	4th in West	1	0	1	.000	Lost in 1st Round
MIN	2019	34	18	16	.529	4th in West	1	0	1	.000	Lost in 1st Round
MIN	2020	22	14	8	.636	4th in West	4	1	3	.250	Lost in Semifinals
MIN	2021	32	22	10	.688	2nd in West	1	0	1	.000	Lost in Second Round
MIN	2022	36	14	22	.389	5th in West	—	—	—		Missed Playoffs
MIN	2023	40	19	21	.475	3rd in West	3	1	2	.333	Lost in 1st Round
MIN	2024	40	30	10	.750	1st in West	12	7	5	.583	Lost in WNBA Finals
MIN	2025	44	34	10	.773	1st in West	6	3	3	.500	Lost in Semifinals
Career		554	364	190	.657		83	52	31	.627	

Sporting positions
Preceded by Jennifer Gillom	Minnesota Lynx Head Coach; 2010–present	Succeeded by Incumbent
Preceded by Bill Laimbeer	Detroit Shock General Manager; 2009	Succeeded by Nolan Richardson
