= Suzie McConnell-Serio =

American basketball player and coach (born 1966)

Biographical details
- Born: July 29, 1966 (age 60); Pittsburgh, Pennsylvania, U.S.

Playing career
- 1984–1988: Penn State
- 1998–2000: Cleveland Rockers
- Position: Guard

Coaching career (HC unless noted)
- 1991–2003: Oakland Catholic High School
- 2003–2006: Minnesota Lynx
- 2007–2013: Duquesne
- 2013–2018: Pittsburgh

Head coaching record
- Overall: 190–155 (.551)

Accomplishments and honors

Championships
- 3× PIAA AAAA champion (1993, 2001, 2003)

Awards
- Kodak All-American (1988); All-American – USBWA (1988); Frances Pomeroy Naismith Award (1988); All-WNBA First Team (1998); 2× Kim Perrot Sportsmanship Award (1998, 2000); WNBA Coach of the Year Award (2004)
- Women's Basketball Hall of Fame
Medal record
Women's basketball
Representing the United States
Olympic Games
Gold medal – first place	1988 Seoul	Team competition
Bronze medal – third place	1992 Barcelona	Team competition
FIBA World Championship
Gold medal – first place	1986 USSR	Team competition
World University Games
Gold medal – first place	1991 Sheffield	Team competition
William Jones Cup
Gold medal – first place	1985 Taipei	Team competition
Assistant coach for the United States
Women's national basketball team
World University Games
Gold medal – first place	2011 Shenzhen	Team competition

Suzie McConnell-Serio (born July 29, 1966) is an American former women's basketball coach and player. She was the head coach for the women's basketball team at Duquesne University from 2007 to 2013 and then the University of Pittsburgh from 2013 to 2018. In 2004, she was named WNBA Coach of the Year as coach of the Minnesota Lynx. She was inducted into the Women's Basketball Hall of Fame in 2008.

== Career ==
Born in Pittsburgh, McConnell-Serio attended Seton-La Salle Catholic High School, leading the Lady Rebels to the PIAA state championship in 1984. McConnell-Serio played college basketball at Penn State. In four seasons at Penn State (1984–85 through 1987–88), she helped the Lady Lions to a 95–33 record and four consecutive NCAA tournament appearances. In the process, she was named the school's first First-Team All-American while setting NCAA Division I records for career assists (1,307), assists in a season (355 in 1987) and season assist average (11.8 in 1987). Her assist total and assist per game average led the nation in both 1986 & 1987. She also set the record for most career points by anyone with 1,000-plus assists at 1,897 points. In 2011, Courtney Vandersloot of Gonzaga University passed her in number of assists in a single season with 367 in 2011, and number of career points with 1,000-plus assists with 2,073 points. As of the start of the 2017–18 season, she still holds the records for most career assists, most assists per game in a season (and most assists per game in a season by a sophomore and by a junior), and most career triple-doubles. She graduated from Penn State in 1988. She won the Frances Pomeroy Naismith Award in 1988. At the time, this award was given to the best women's basketball player in the country no taller than 5 ft 6 in (1.68 m); the height limit was later increased to 5 ft 8 in (1.73 m) before it was discontinued in 2013. She also ended her college career with seven career triple-doubles, which at the time was an NCAA all-divisions women's record (later equaled by Louella Tomlinson of Saint Mary's). This record has since been broken by Oregon's Sabrina Ionescu.

Before joining the Minnesota Lynx, McConnell-Serio served as head coach of the girls' basketball team at Oakland Catholic High School in Pittsburgh for 13 years, from 1991 to 2003. During that time, her teams won 3 PIAA state championships (1993, 2001, 2003), were runners-up twice (2000–2002), and won five consecutive district championships (1999–2003). On December 17, 2002, she reached a coaching milestone with her 300th win. She finished her high school coaching career after the 2002–03 season with a 321–86 record.

McConnell-Serio also played in the WNBA. The former point guard played three seasons with the Cleveland Rockers (1998–2000). As a first-year player in 1998, she earned WNBA Newcomer of the Year and All-WNBA First Team honors after averaging 8.6 ppg and 6.4 apg (second in the league). She was a two-time winner of the Kim Perrot Sportsmanship Award (1998 and 2000) and finished her professional career with averages of 6.4 ppg and 4.6 apg in 81 contests.

In January 2003, McConnell-Serio returned to the WNBA as head coach of the Minnesota Lynx and took a team that finished 10–22 in the previous season to an 18–16 record and first-ever playoff appearance.

One year later, McConnell-Serio took a team picked to finish last in the Western Conference by a number of preseason publications and made a return trip to the playoffs and in the process was named the 2004 WNBA Coach of the Year. The '04 Lynx, who earned a franchise-best #3 seed in the WNBA Western Conference, tied franchise records for wins (18), home victories (11) and road wins (7) all set in McConnell-Serio's first season. In addition, Minnesota enjoyed a franchise-record six-game winning streak.

However, the Lynx struggled in the 2005 and 2006 season, and McConnell-Serio resigned at mid-season on July 23, 2006.

Prior to her professional playing career, McConnell-Serio won two Olympic medals. She was a member of a gold medal-winning U.S. women's basketball team in the 1988 Summer Olympics, and earned a bronze medal at the 1992 Summer Olympics.

McConnell-Serio also won a gold medal at the 1991 World University Games. She won the 2004 WNBA Coach of the Year Award. In 1999, Sports Illustrated magazine named her one of the Top 50 Athletes of the Century in Pennsylvania.

On April 13, 2007, McConnell-Serio was named the head coach at Duquesne University.

On April 12, 2013, McConnell-Serio was named the head coach at the University of Pittsburgh. She was fired on April 5, 2018.

=== Penn State statistics ===
Legend
GP	Games played	GS	Games started	MPG	Minutes per game
FG%	Field goal percentage	3P%	3-point field goal percentage	FT%	Free throw percentage
RPG	Rebounds per game	APG	Assists per game	SPG	Steals per game
BPG	Blocks per game	PPG	Points per game	**Bold**	Career high

Year	Team	GP	Points	FG%	3P%	FT%	RPG	APG	SPG	BPG	PPG
1985	Penn State	**33**	415	45.8%	NA	74.3%	2.8	9.7	NA	NA	12.6
1986	Penn State	32	382	44.2%	NA	78.9%	2.9	10.6	NA	NA	11.9
1987	Penn State	30	418	**50.1%**	NA	72.3%	4.7	**11.8**	NA	NA	13.9
1988	Penn State	**33**	**682**	49.9%	**40.0%**	**81.1%**	**5.0**	8.9	**3.9**	**0.2**	**20.7**
Career		128	1897	47.8%	40.0%	77.0%	3.9	10.2	NA	NA	14.8

== Personal life ==
McConnell-Serio is married to Pete Serio, and they have four children, Peter, Jordan, Mandi, and Madison, who all have played basketball.

McConnell-Serio is a member of the Women's Basketball Hall of Fame. She was inducted into it on June 14, 2008, at the Bijou Theatre in Knoxville, Tennessee.

McConnell-Serio's brother, Tom, played two seasons at Davidson College and was the head coach for Saint Francis (Pennsylvania) from 1992 to 1999 and has been an assistant coach at Wake Forest, Marquette, and Dayton as well as women's assistant coach at Colorado with their sister, Kathy. Before becoming the current head coach of the Indiana University of Pennsylvania women's team, he served as an assistant at Old Dominion.

McConnell-Serio's sister, Kathy, who was her teammate on the 1984 PIAA championship team, served as her associate head coach at the University of Pittsburgh. She was previously the head coach at the universities of Tulsa (1999–2005) and Colorado (2006–10) before accepting a position as an assistant coach with the WNBA's Tulsa Shock. She was also an assistant coach at the University of Illinois (1996–99) and Rutgers (1994–95). Her first coaching job out of college was at the University of Pittsburgh as a recruiting coordinator during the 1991 season. She played in four NCAA championships while at the University of Virginia.

McConnell-Serio's brother, Tim, played at Waynesburg University and has served as the boys' coach at Chartiers Valley from 1992 to 2018 and has won over 80 percent of his games while earning his 400th career win in 2010. In 2018, he moved to coach the Chartiers Valley girls' basketball team.

McConnell-Serio's sister, Maureen, played at the University of Pittsburgh, and her nephew, T. J. (Tim's son) was on the Duquesne men's basketball team for two seasons (2011 and 2012) before transferring to Arizona. He currently plays for the Indiana Pacers. Her niece, Megan, played on the Duquesne women's basketball team and now plays for the Phoenix Mercury.

== Career statistics ==
Legend
GP	Games played	GS	Games started	MPG	Minutes per game	RPG	Rebounds per game
APG	Assists per game	SPG	Steals per game	BPG	Blocks per game	PPG	Points per game
TO	Turnovers per game	FG%	Field-goal percentage	3P%	3-point field-goal percentage	FT%	Free-throw percentage
**Bold**	Career best	°	League leader

=== Regular season ===
Year	Team	GP	GS	MPG	FG%	3P%	FT%	RPG	APG	SPG	BPG	TO	PPG
1998	Cleveland	28	28	**31.5**	**.455**	**.408**	.729	2.2	**6.4**	**1.8**	**0.2**	3.7	**8.6**
1999	Cleveland	18	18	28.4	.367	.333	**.842**	**2.4**	4.2	0.6	0.1	3.0	6.0
2000	Cleveland	**32**	**32**	22.0	.414	.392	.760	1.6	3.7	0.5	0.0	**2.2**	5.4
Career	3 years, 1 team	78	78	26.9	.420	.382	.754	2.0	4.8	1.0	0.1	2.9	6.7

=== Playoffs ===
Year	Team	GP	GS	MPG	FG%	3P%	FT%	RPG	APG	SPG	BPG	TO	PPG
1998	Cleveland	3	3	**33.0**	**.500**	**.429**	.667	**2.3**	**5.0**	**2.7**	**0.3**	3.0	6.3
2000	Cleveland	**6**	**6**	24.5	.311	.250	**1.000**	**2.3**	4.2	0.8	0.2	**2.7**	**6.5**
Career	2 years, 1 team	9	9	27.3	.356	.279	.800	2.3	4.4	1.4	0.2	2.8	6.4

== Head coaching record ==
=== WNBA ===
Team	Year	G	W	L	W–L%	Finish	PG	PW	PL	PW–L%	Result
Minnesota	2003	34	18	16	.529	4th in Western	3	1	2	.333	Lost Conference semifinals
Minnesota	2004	34	18	16	.529	3rd in Western	2	0	2	.000	Lost Conference semifinals
Minnesota	2005	34	14	20	.412	6th in Western	—	—	—	—	Missed playoffs
Minnesota	2006	23	8	15	.348	7th in Western	—	—	—	—	Missed playoffs
Career		125	58	67	.464		5	1	4	.200	

=== College ===
Record table
Season	Team	Overall	Conference	Standing	Postseason
Duquesne Dukes (Atlantic 10 Conference) (2007–2013)
2007–08	Duquesne	15–15	6–8	7th	
2008–09	Duquesne	20–12	9–5	T–4th	WNIT 1st Round
2009–10	Duquesne	20–12	9–5	T–4th	WNIT 1st Round
2010–11	Duquesne	24–9	9–5	3rd	WNIT 3rd Round
2011–12	Duquesne	20–12	7–7	T-6th	WNIT 1st Round
2012–13	Duquesne	24–8	11–3	T-4th	WNIT 2nd Round
Duquesne:		123–68 (.644)	51–33 (.607)		
Pittsburgh Panthers (Atlantic Coast Conference) (2013–2018)
2013–14	Pittsburgh	11–20	3–13	T–14th	
2014–15	Pittsburgh	20–12	9–7	7th	NCAA 2nd Round
2015–16	Pittsburgh	13–18	4–12	T–12th	
2016–17	Pittsburgh	13–17	4–12	T–11th	
2017–18	Pittsburgh	10–20	2–14	T–14th	
Pittsburgh:		67–87 (.435)	22–58 (.275)		
Total:		190–155 (.551)			
National champion Postseason invitational champion Conference regular season champion Conference regular season and conference tournament champion Division regular season champion Division regular season and conference tournament champion Conference tournament champion

== See also ==
- List of Pennsylvania State University Olympians
- List of NCAA Division I women's basketball career assists leaders
- List of NCAA Division I basketball career triple-doubles leaders
