= 2007 Minnesota Lynx season =

Sports season

- Head coach: Don Zierden
- Arena: Target Center

Results
- Record: 10–24 (.294)
- Place: 6th (Western)
- Playoff finish: Did not qualify

The 2007 Minnesota Lynx season was the 9th season for the Minnesota Lynx of the Women's National Basketball Association, and the first season under head coach Don Zierden.

The Lynx tied their franchise-worst record from 2006 and missed the playoffs for the third consecutive season.

== Offseason ==
=== Dispersal Draft ===
Pick	Player	Nationality	Former team
2	Tangela Smith	United States	Charlotte Sting

=== WNBA draft ===
Round	Pick	Player	Nationality	College/School/Team
1	1	Lindsey Harding	United States	Duke
1	4	Noelle Quinn	United States	UCLA
2	15	Eshaya Murphy	United States	USC
2	24	Kathrin Ress	Italy	Boston College

== Regular season ==
=== Season standings ===
Western Conference	W	L	PCT	GB	Home	Road	Conf.
Phoenix Mercury ^{x}	23	11	.676	–	12–5	11–6	17–5
San Antonio Silver Stars ^{x}	20	14	.588	3.0	9–8	11–6	13–9
Sacramento Monarchs ^{x}	19	15	.559	4.0	12–5	7–10	12–10
Seattle Storm ^{x}	17	17	.500	6.0	12–5	5–12	11–11
Houston Comets ^{o}	13	21	.382	10.0	7–10	6–11	10–12
Minnesota Lynx ^{o}	10	24	.294	13.0	7–10	3–14	8–14
Los Angeles Sparks ^{o}	10	24	.294	13.0	5–12	5–12	6–16

=== Season schedule ===
Date	Opponent	Score	Result	Record
May 19	@ Indiana	64-83	Loss	0-1
May 20	Sacramento	64-74	Loss	0-2
May 22	@ Detroit	75-85	Loss	0-3
May 25	Chicago	77-82	Loss	0-4
May 29	Indiana	75-89	Loss	0-5
June 1	New York	60-70	Loss	0-6
June 3	@ Chicago	72-78	Loss	0-7
June 5	@ Phoenix	90-85	Win	1-7
June 8	@ Los Angeles	87-90	Loss	1-8
June 9	@ Seattle	76-90	Loss	1-9
June 13	Connecticut	77-73 (OT)	Win	2-9
June 16	Los Angeles	83-58	Win	3-9
June 20	@ San Antonio	73-80	Loss	3-10
June 22	Seattle	78-76	Win	4-10
June 29	@ San Antonio	77-66	Win	5-10
July 1	@ Sacramento	68-76	Loss	5-11
July 3	Phoenix	79-95	Loss	5-12
July 6*	Sacramento	80-85	Loss	5-13
July 8	Houston	67-79	Loss	5-14
July 10	@ Washington	83-91 (OT)	Loss	5-15
July 12	@ Houston	77-87	Loss	5-16
July 17	@ Connecticut	79-84	Loss	5-17
July 20	Washington	87-91 (OT)	Loss	5-18
July 22	@ Phoenix	93-106	Loss	5-19
July 25	Phoenix	79-103	Loss	5-20
July 27	Los Angeles	85-76	Win	6-20
July 29	@ Sacramento	78-73	Win	7-20
August 2	@ New York	66-71	Loss	7-21
August 4	Houston	77-80	Loss	7-22
August 7	Seattle	95-74	Win	8-22
August 12	@ Los Angeles	80-89	Loss	8-23
August 14	@ Seattle	67-81	Loss	8-24
August 16	Detroit	87-77	Win	9-24
August 19	San Antonio	81-55	Win	10-24

* The July 6 game was played at Williams Arena due to a conflict at Target Center.

== Player stats ==
Player	Games played	Rebounds	Assists	Steals	Block	Points
Seimone Augustus	34	136	79	41	21	769
Nicole Ohlde	34	208	56	17	20	392
Svetlana Abrosimova	34	150	85	44	4	345
Kristen Mann	34	122	43	31	7	258
Lindsey Harding	20	87	78	20	6	233
Shay Murphy	32	104	17	19	8	165
Kiesha Brown	33	49	52	14	5	153
Tiffany Stansbury	30	130	15	13	11	130
Noelle Quinn	34	89	148	29	13	96
Amber Jacobs	29	20	40	9	0	93
Tamika Raymond	21	40	6	2	0	31
Navonda Moore	19	15	4	3	0	21
Megan Duffy	5	5	7	1	0	7
