= WNBA expansion draft =

The Women's National Basketball Association (WNBA) expansion draft is an event hosted by the WNBA as needed that allows expansion teams to select from a pool of existing WNBA players to build their debut rosters. Pre-existing WNBA teams are allowed to protect six players on their current rosters from being drafted.

Prior to the 2000 expansion draft, the WNBA allocated players from outside of the league to new expansion teams both prior to and following the WNBA draft and expansion drafts.

The WNBA has hosted seven expansion drafts since the league's creation in 1996 with the introduction of the Detroit Shock and Washington Mystics in 1998; the Minnesota Lynx and Orlando Miracle in 1999; the Indiana Fever, Miami Sol, Portland Fire, and Seattle Storm in 2000; the Chicago Sky in 2006; the Atlanta Dream in 2008; the Golden State Valkyries in 2024; and the Toronto Tempo and the new Portland Fire team in 2025.

== 1998: Detroit Shock, Washington Mystics ==
=== Initial player allocation ===
Pick	Player	Nationality	WNBA team	School/club team
1	Cindy Brown (F)	United States	Detroit Shock	Long Beach State (from Seattle Reign, ABL)
2	Razija Mujanović (C)	Bosnia and Herzegovina	Detroit Shock	Bosnia and Herzegovina
3	Nikki McCray (G)	United States	Washington Mystics	Tennessee (from Columbus Quest, ABL)
4	Alessandra Santos de Oliveira (C)	Brazil	Washington Mystics	Pool Comense (Italy)

=== Expansion draft ===
Pick	Player	Nationality	New team	Former team
1	Rhonda Blades (G)	United States	Detroit Shock	New York Liberty
2	Heidi Burge (F)	United States	Washington Mystics	Los Angeles Sparks
3	Tajama Abraham (C)	United States	Detroit Shock	Sacramento Monarchs
4	Penny Moore (F)	United States	Washington Mystics	Charlotte Sting
5	Tara Williams (G)	United States	Detroit Shock	Phoenix Mercury
6	Deborah Carter (F)	United States	Washington Mystics	Utah Starzz
7	Lynette Woodard (G)	United States	Detroit Shock	Cleveland Rockers
8	Tammy Jackson (F/C)	United States	Washington Mystics	Houston Comets

== 1999: Minnesota Lynx, Orlando Miracle ==
=== Initial player allocation ===
Pick	Player	Nationality	New WNBA team	College/country/team
1	Kristin Folkl (F)	United States	Minnesota Lynx	Stanford
2	Nykesha Sales (G/F)	United States	Orlando Miracle	Connecticut

=== Expansion draft selections ===
Pick	Player	Nationality	New WNBA team	Former WNBA team	College/country/team
1	Brandy Reed (F)	United States	Minnesota Lynx	Phoenix Mercury	Southern Mississippi
2	Andrea Congreaves (F)	United Kingdom	Orlando Miracle	Charlotte Sting	Mercer
3	Kim Williams (G)	United States	Minnesota Lynx	Utah Starzz	DePaul
4	Kisha Ford (G)	United States	Orlando Miracle	New York Liberty	Georgia Tech
5	Octavia Blue (G)	United States	Minnesota Lynx	Los Angeles Sparks	Miami (FL)
6	Yolanda Moore (F)	United States	Orlando Miracle	Houston Comets	Mississippi
7	Adia Barnes (F)	United States	Minnesota Lynx	Sacramento Monarchs	Arizona
8	Adrienne Johnson (G)	United States	Orlando Miracle	Cleveland Rockers	Ohio State

=== Post-expansion draft player allocation ===
Pick	Player	Nationality	New WNBA team	College/country/team
1	Katie Smith (F)	United States	Minnesota Lynx	Ohio State from Columbus Quest, ABL
2	Shannon Johnson (G/F)	United States	Orlando Miracle	South Carolina from Columbus Quest, ABL

== 2000: Indiana Fever, Miami Sol, Portland Fire, Seattle Storm ==
Pick	Player	Nationality	New WNBA team	Former WNBA team	College/country/team
1	Gordana Grubin (G)	FR Yugoslavia	Indiana Fever	Los Angeles Sparks	MiZo Pecs (Hungary)
2	Edna Campbell (G)	United States	Seattle Storm	Phoenix Mercury	Texas
3	Kate Starbird (G)	United States	Miami Sol	Sacramento Monarchs	Stanford
4	Alisa Burras (F)	United States	Portland Fire	Cleveland Rockers	Louisiana Tech
5	Sophia Witherspoon (G)	United States	Portland Fire	New York Liberty	Florida
6	Sandy Brondello (G)	Australia	Miami Sol	Detroit Shock	BTV Wuppertal (Germany)
7	Sonja Henning (G)	United States	Seattle Storm	Houston Comets	Stanford
8	Stephanie McCarthy (G)	United States	Indiana Fever	Charlotte Sting	Purdue
9	Nyree Roberts (C)	United States	Indiana Fever	Washington Mystics	Old Dominion
10	Angela Aycock (F)	United States	Seattle Storm	Minnesota Lynx	Kansas
11	Debbie Black (G)	United States	Miami Sol	Utah Starzz	St. Joseph's
12	Tari Phillips (C)	United States	Portland Fire	Orlando Miracle	Florida
13	Coquese Washington (G)	United States	Portland Fire	New York Liberty	Notre Dame
14	Sharon Manning (F)	United States	Miami Sol	Charlotte Sting	North Carolina State
15	Nina Bjedov (C)	FR Yugoslavia	Seattle Storm	Los Angeles Sparks	Basket Bees Pavia (Italy)
16	Rita Williams (G)	United States	Indiana Fever	Washington Mystics	Connecticut
17	Kara Wolters (C)	United States	Indiana Fever	Houston Comets	Connecticut
18	Toni Foster (F)	United States	Seattle Storm	Phoenix Mercury	Iowa
19	Lesley Brown (F)	United States	Miami Sol	Detroit Shock	Virginia
20	Molly Goodenbour (G)	United States	Portland Fire	Sacramento Monarchs	Stanford
21	Jamila Wideman (G)	United States	Portland Fire	Cleveland Rockers	Stanford
22	Yolanda Moore (F)	United States	Miami Sol	Orlando Miracle	Mississippi
23	Charmin Smith (G)	United States	Seattle Storm	Minnesota Lynx	Stanford
24	Chantel Tremitiere (G)	United States	Indiana Fever	Utah Starzz	Auburn

== 2006: Chicago Sky ==
On November 16, 2005, an expansion draft occurred to help fill the roster for the Chicago Sky.

Pick	Player	Nationality	Former WNBA team	College/country/team
1	Jia Perkins (G)	United States	Charlotte Sting	Texas Tech
2	Brooke Wyckoff (F)	United States	Connecticut Sun	Florida State
3	Elaine Powell (G)	United States	Detroit Shock	LSU
4	Kiesha Brown (G)	United States	Houston Comets	Georgia
5	Deanna Jackson (F)	United States	Indiana Fever	Alabama-Birmingham
6	Laura Macchi (F)	Italy	Los Angeles Sparks	Pool Comense (Italy)
7	Stacey Lovelace-Tolbert (F)	United States	Minnesota Lynx	Purdue
8	DeTrina White (F)	United States	New York Liberty	LSU
9	Ashley Robinson (C)	United States	Phoenix Mercury	Tennessee
10	Chelsea Newton (G)	United States	Sacramento Monarchs	Rutgers
11	Bernadette Ngoyisa (C)	Republic of the Congo	San Antonio Silver Stars	Congo
12	Francesca Zara (G)	Italy	Seattle Storm	Napoli Basket Vomero (Italy)
13	Stacey Dales-Schuman (G)	Canada	Washington Mystics	Oklahoma

== 2008: Atlanta Dream ==
On February 6, 2008, an expansion draft occurred to help fill the roster for the Atlanta Dream. The team also participated in the 2008 WNBA draft prior to the team's first season.

Pick	Player	Nationality	Former WNBA team	College/country/team
1	Carla Thomas (F)	United States	Chicago Sky	Vanderbilt
2	Érika de Souza (F)	Brazil	Connecticut Sun	Spain
3	Katie Feenstra (C)	United States	Detroit Shock	Liberty
4	Roneeka Hodges (F)	United States	Houston Comets	Florida State
5	Ann Strother (G)	United States	Indiana Fever	Connecticut
6	LaToya Thomas (G)	United States	Los Angeles Sparks	Mississippi State
7	Kristen Mann (F)	United States	Minnesota Lynx	UC Santa Barbara
8	Ann Wauters (C)	Belgium	New York Liberty	Valenciennes Olympic (France)
9	Jennifer Lacy (F)	United States	Phoenix Mercury	Pepperdine
10	Kristin Haynie (G)	United States	Sacramento Monarchs	Michigan State
11	Chantelle Anderson (C)	United States	San Antonio Silver Stars	Vanderbilt
12	Betty Lennox (G)	United States	Seattle Storm	Louisiana Tech
13	Yelena Leuchanka (F)	Belarus	Washington Mystics	West Virginia

== 2024: Golden State Valkyries ==
On December 6, 2024, an expansion draft occurred to help fill the roster for the expansion Golden State Valkyries. The team also participated in the 2025 WNBA draft prior to the team's first season in 2025.

The WNBA announced on September 30, 2024, that the expansion draft would be held on December 6 and televised by ESPN, and also announced the draft rules. Each existing WNBA team had to provide the league office with a list of all players to which it held contract rights as of the final day of the 2024 regular season; the submission deadline was not determined, but was expected to be about 10 days before the draft. Each team also had to designate no more than six players who would not be eligible for selection. The Valkyries were allowed to select one available player from each of the 12 previously existing teams. Only one player eligible to become an unrestricted free agent at the end of the 2024 season could be chosen, and that player could not have played under a "core player" contract for two or more seasons. The Valkyries were allowed to make trades prior to the expansion draft, including agreements to (1) select a given player and trade that player to another team, or (2) select or not select an available player from a given team.

Pick	Player	Nationality	Former WNBA team	College/country/team
1	Iliana Rupert (C)	France	Atlanta Dream	France
2	María Conde (F)	Spain	Chicago Sky	Florida State
3	Veronica Burton (G)	United States	Connecticut Sun	Northwestern
4	Carla Leite (G)	France	Dallas Wings	France
5	Temi Fagbenle (C)	Great Britain	Indiana Fever	USC
6	Kate Martin (G)	United States	Las Vegas Aces	Iowa
7	Stephanie Talbot (F)	Australia	Los Angeles Sparks	Australia
8	Cecilia Zandalasini (F)	Italy	Minnesota Lynx	Italy
9	Kayla Thornton (F)	United States	New York Liberty	UTEP
10	Monique Billings (F)	United States	Phoenix Mercury	UCLA
11	No selection	—	Seattle Storm	—
12	Julie Vanloo (G)	Belgium	Washington Mystics	Belgium

== 2026: Portland Fire, Toronto Tempo ==
On April 3, 2026, an expansion draft was held to help fill the rosters for the Portland Fire and the Toronto Tempo. A coin flip determined the first team to draft. The draft consisted of two rounds with each team alternating selecting from a pool of unprotected WNBA roster players. Portland had the first pick in the first round, while Toronto had the first pick in the second round.

Pick	Player	Position	Nationality	New WNBA team	Former WNBA team	College
1	Bridget Carleton	F	Canada	Portland Fire	Minnesota Lynx	Iowa State
2	Julie Allemand	G	Belgium	Toronto Tempo	Los Angeles Sparks	BC Castors Braine
3	Carla Leite	G	France	Portland Fire	Golden State Valkyries	–
4	Nyara Sabally	C	Germany	Toronto Tempo	New York Liberty	Oregon
5	Luisa Geiselsöder	C	Germany	Portland Fire	Dallas Wings	–
6	Marina Mabrey	G	United States	Toronto Tempo	Connecticut Sun	Notre Dame
7	Emily Engstler	F	United States	Portland Fire	Washington Mystics	Louisville
8	Aaliyah Nye	G	United States	Toronto Tempo	Las Vegas Aces	Alabama
9	Maya Caldwell	G	United States	Portland Fire	Atlanta Dream	Georgia
10	Lexi Held	G	United States	Toronto Tempo	Phoenix Mercury	DePaul
11	Chloe Bibby	G	Australia	Portland Fire	Indiana Fever	Maryland
12	No selection / pass	–	–	Toronto Tempo	–	–
13	María Conde	F	Spain	Toronto Tempo	Golden State Valkyries	Florida State
14	Haley Jones	G	United States	Portland Fire	Dallas Wings	Stanford
15	Maria Kliundikova	F	Russia	Toronto Tempo	Minnesota Lynx	Dynamo Kursk
16	Nyadiew Puoch	G	Australia	Portland Fire	Atlanta Dream	–
17	Adja Kane	F	France	Toronto Tempo	New York Liberty	–
18	Sarah Ashlee Barker	G	United States	Portland Fire	Los Angeles Sparks	Alabama
19	Nikolina Milić	F	Serbia	Toronto Tempo	Connecticut Sun	–
20	Sug Sutton	G	United States	Portland Fire	Washington Mystics	Texas
21	Kitija Laksa	F	Latvia	Toronto Tempo	Phoenix Mercury	South Florida
22	No selection / pass	–	–	Portland Fire	–	–
23	Kristy Wallace	G	Australia	Toronto Tempo	Indiana Fever	Baylor
24	Nika Mühl	G	Croatia	Portland Fire	Seattle Storm	Connecticut

== Future expansion ==
On June 30, 2025, the WNBA announced that it would expand to Cleveland (2028), Detroit (2029), and Philadelphia (2030), bringing the total to 18 teams.
