= 2025 Golden State Valkyries season =

Inaugural season of the Golden State Valkyries

- Head coach: Natalie Nakase
- Arena: Chase Center

Results
- Record: 23–21 (.523)
- Place: 4th (Western)
- Playoff finish: 8th seed Lost in First Round 0–2 to Minnesota Lynx

The 2025 Golden State Valkyries season was the franchise's 1st season in the Women's National Basketball Association and under head coach, Natalie Nakase.

== Draft ==
Round	Pick	Player	Position	Nationality	College/Club	Outcome	Ref.
1	5	Justė Jocytė	G/F	Lithuania	ASVEL Féminin	Rights retained	
2	17	Shyanne Sellers	G	United States	Maryland	Signed rookie contract on April 22; Waived on May 3	
3	30	Kaitlyn Chen	G	United States / Taiwan	UConn	Signed rookie contract on April 22; Waived on May 14	

== Transactions ==
=== Front office and coaching ===
Date	Details	Ref.
October 10, 2024	Hired Natalie Nakase as head coach	
February 10, 2025	Hired Lorena Torres Ronda as director of performance	
March 27, 2025	Hired Kasib Powell, Sugar Rodgers, and Landon Tatum as assistant coaches	
March 27, 2025	Hired Sidney Parsons as director of player development	
March 27, 2025	Hired Sidney Dobner as head video coordinator/coach development	
March 27, 2025	Hired Daisy Feder as assistant video coordinator	
April 25, 2025	Hired Joscelyn Bourne as head of physical therapy	
April 25, 2025	Hired Katelin Knox as head athletic trainer	
April 25, 2025	Hired Allison DeKuiper as assistant athletic trainer and performance coordinator	
April 25, 2025	Hired Papis Sambe as performance coach	
September 15, 2025	Vanja Černivec, Vice President of Basketball Operations, left Valkyries organization	

=== Expansion draft ===
On December 6, 2024, an expansion draft took place to help fill the roster for Golden State for the 2025 WNBA season.

Player	Former Team	Contract Status (at time of draft)	Ref.
(France) Iliana Rupert	Atlanta Dream	Suspended – contract expired	
(Spain) María Conde	Chicago Sky	Suspended – contract expired	
Veronica Burton	Connecticut Sun	Free agent – reserved	
(France) Carla Leite	Dallas Wings	Unsigned 2024 draft pick (No. 9)	
(United Kingdom) Temi Fágbénlé	Indiana Fever	Free agent – restricted	
(United States) Kate Martin	Las Vegas Aces	Under contract for 2025 season	
(Australia) Stephanie Talbot	Los Angeles Sparks	Under contract for 2025 season	
(Italy) Cecilia Zandalasini	Minnesota Lynx	Free agent – reserved	
(United States) Kayla Thornton	New York Liberty	Under contract for 2025 season	
(United States) Monique Billings	Phoenix Mercury	Free agent – unrestricted	
No selection	Seattle Storm	—N/a	
(Belgium) Julie Vanloo	Washington Mystics	Free agent – reserved	

=== Free agency ===
==== Re-signed / extensions ====
Player	Date	Notes	Ref.
(United Kingdom) Temi Fágbénlé	June 25	Set as active	
(France) Janelle Salaün	June 30	Set as active	
(Italy) Cecilia Zandalasini	June 30	Set as active	
(France) Iliana Rupert	July 16	Set as active	

==== Additions ====
Player	Date	Notes	Former Team	Ref.
(United States) Monique Billings	February 3	One-year deal	Phoenix Mercury (2024 WNBA expansion draft)	
(United States) Veronica Burton	February 3	Training camp contract	Connecticut Sun (2024 WNBA expansion draft)	
(Belgium) Julie Vanloo	February 3	Training camp contract	Washington Mystics (2024 WNBA expansion draft)	
(Australia) Chloe Bibby	February 5	Training camp contract	(Spain) Spar Girona (LF)	
(France) Janelle Salaün	February 5	Training camp contract	(Italy) Famila Schio (Lega Basket Femminile)	
(Belgium) Kyara Linskens	February 5	Training camp contract	Free agent	
(United States) Elissa Cunane	February 6	Training camp contract	(Czech Republic) BK Žabiny Brno (ZBL)	
(Azerbaijan) Tiffany Hayes	February 6	One-year deal	Las Vegas Aces	
(Canada) Laeticia Amihere	February 6	Awarded off waivers	Atlanta Dream	
(Canada) Laeticia Amihere	June 8	Rest of season contract	Golden State Valkyries	
(France) Carla Leite	February 21	Rookie contract	Dallas Wings (2024 WNBA expansion draft – rights to 2024 draft pick No. 9)	
(Italy) Cecilia Zandalasini	March 7	One-year deal	Minnesota Lynx (2024 WNBA expansion draft)	
(United Kingdom) Temi Fágbénlé	April 1	One-year deal	Indiana Fever (2024 WNBA expansion draft)	
(France) Mamignan Touré	April 21	Training camp contract	(Spain) Spar Girona (LF)	
(United States) Kaitlyn Chen	April 22	Rookie contract (2025 draft pick No. 30)	UConn	
(United States) Shyanne Sellers	April 22	Rookie contract (2025 draft pick No. 17)	Maryland	
(United States) Aerial Powers	June 10	Rest of season contract	Atlanta Dream	
(Australia) Chloe Bibby	June 15	Rest of season contract	Golden State Valkyries	
(United States) Kaitlyn Chen	June 15	Rest of season contract	Golden State Valkyries	
(United States) Bree Hall	June 18	Rest of season contract	Indiana Fever	
(United States) Bree Hall	August 27	7-day hardship contract	Golden State Valkyries	
(United States) Kaila Charles	August 1	7-day hardship contract	Dallas Wings	
(United States) Kaila Charles	August 8	7-day hardship contract	Golden State Valkyries	
(United States) Kaila Charles	August 15	7-day hardship contract	Golden State Valkyries	
(United States) Elizabeth Kitley	September 3	7-day hardship contract	Las Vegas Aces	

=== Subtractions / unsigned ===
Player	Date	Reason	New Team	Ref.
(Spain) María Conde	December 6	Suspended – contract expired	N/A – retained rights	
(France) Iliana Rupert	December 6	Suspended – contract expired	N/A – retained rights	
(Lithuania) Justė Jocytė	April 14	Unsigned draft pick (2025 draft pick – No. 5)	N/A – retained rights	
(United States) Shyanne Sellers	May 3	Waived	Atlanta Dream	
(Canada) Laeticia Amihere	May 14	Waived	—	
(United States) Kaitlyn Chen	May 14	Waived	—	
(United States) Elissa Cunane	May 14	Waived	—	
(France) Mamignan Touré	May 14	Waived	Connecticut Sun	
(Australia) Chloe Bibby	May 14	Waived	—	
(Australia) Chloe Bibby	June 30	Waived	Indiana Fever	
(Belgium) Kyara Linskens	June 8	Waived	—	
(Italy) Cecilia Zandalasini	June 8	Suspended contract – temporary	N/A – retained rights	
(Belgium) Julie Vanloo	June 10	Suspended contract – temporary	N/A – retained rights	
(Belgium) Julie Vanloo	June 30	Waived	Los Angeles Sparks	
(France) Janelle Salaün	June 11	Suspended contract – temporary	N/A – retained rights	
(United Kingdom) Temi Fágbénlé	June 15	Suspended contract – temporary	N/A – retained rights	
(United States) Aerial Powers	June 25	Waived	Indiana Fever	
(United States) Bree Hall	June 30	Waived	—	
(United States) Bree Hall	September 1	Waived	Indiana Fever	
(Australia) Stephanie Talbot	July 13	Waived	New York Liberty	
(United States) Elizabeth Kitley	September 9	Waived	—	

== Roster ==
2025 Golden State Valkyries roster
Players
Coaches

Pos.	No.	Nat.	Name	Height	Weight	DOB	From	Yrs
F	3	(Canada)	Amihere, Laeticia	6' 3" (1.91m)	185 lb (84kg)	2001-07-10	South Carolina	2
F	25	(United States)	Billings, Monique	6' 4" (1.93m)	192 lb (87kg)	1996-05-02	UCLA	7
G	22	(United States)	Burton, Veronica	5' 9" (1.75m)	155 lb (70kg)	2000-07-12	Northwestern	3
G/F	6	(United States)	Charles, Kaila	6' 1" (1.85m)	168 lb (76kg)	1998-03-23	Maryland	4
G	2	(United States)	Chen, Kaitlyn	5' 9" (1.75m)		2002-02-22	Connecticut	R
C	14	(United Kingdom)	Fagbenle, Temi	6' 4" (1.93m)	180 lb (82kg)	1992-09-08	USC	4
G	15	(Azerbaijan)	Hayes, Tiffany (injured)	5' 10" (1.78m)	155 lb (70kg)	1989-09-20	Connecticut	12
G	0	(France)	Leite, Carla	5' 9" (1.75m)		2004-04-16	France	R
G	20	(United States)	Martin, Kate	6' 0" (1.83m)	172 lb (78kg)	2000-06-05	Iowa	1
C	12	(France)	Rupert, Iliana	6' 4" (1.93m)	189 lb (86kg)	2001-07-12	France	2
F	13	(France)	Salaün, Janelle	6' 2" (1.88m)		2001-09-05	France	R
F	5	(United States)	Thornton, Kayla (injured)	6' 1" (1.85m)	190 lb (86kg)	1992-10-20	UTEP	9
F	24	(Italy)	Zandalasini, Cecilia	6' 2" (1.88m)	175 lb (79kg)	1996-03-16	Italy	3
F	—	(Spain)	Conde, María (injured) (S)	6' 1" (1.85m)	152 lb (69kg)	1997-01-14	Florida State	–
G/F	—	(Lithuania)	Jocytė, Justė (DP)	6' 2" (1.88m)		2005-11-19	Lithuania	–

Head coach
(United States) Natalie Nakase (UCLA)
Assistant coaches
(United States) Kasib Powell (Texas Tech)
(United States) Sugar Rodgers (Georgetown)
(United States) Landon Tatum (Idaho)
Player development
(United States) Sidney Parsons (Bridgeport)
Athletic trainer
(United States) Katelin Knox
Assistant trainer
(United States) Allison DeKuiper

Legend

- (C) Team captain
- (DP) Unsigned draft pick
- (FA) Free agent
- (S) Suspended
- Injured

=== Depth chart ===
Pos.	Starter	Bench
PG	Veronica Burton	Kaitlyn Chen; Tiffany Hayes
SG	Cecilia Zandalasini	Carla Leite; Kate Martin
SF	Janelle Salaün	Laeticia Amihere
PF	Kayla Thornton	Monique Billings
C	Temi Fágbénlé	Iliana Rupert

== Schedule ==
=== Preseason ===
2025 pre-season game log
Total: 1–1 (Home: 0–1; Road: 1–0)
May: 1–1 (Home: 0–1; Road: 1–0)

Game	Date	Team	Score	High points	High rebounds	High assists	Location Attendance	Record
1	May 6	Los Angeles	L 82–83	Laeticia Amihere (20)	Billings, Linskens (8)	Veronica Burton (4)	Chase Center; 17,428	0–1
2	May 11	@ Phoenix	W 84–79	Mamignan Touré (19)	Monique Billings (7)	Julie Vanloo (6)	PHX Arena; 6,430	1–1

2025 pre-season schedule

=== Regular season ===
2025 game log
Total: 23–21 (Home: 14–8; Road: 9–13)
May: 2–3 (Home: 1–1; Road: 1–2)

Game	Date	Team	Score	High points	High rebounds	High assists	Location Attendance	Record
1	May 16	Los Angeles	L 67–84	Tiffany Hayes (19)	Tiffany Hayes (9)	Temi Fagbenle (4)	Chase Center; 18,064	0–1
2	May 21	Washington	W 76–74	Veronica Burton (22)	Veronica Burton (9)	Veronica Burton (5)	Chase Center; 18,064	1–1
3	May 23	@ Los Angeles	W 75–72	Carla Leite (19)	Kayla Thornton (10)	Carla Leite (3)	Crypto.com Arena; 10,857	2–1
4	May 27	@ New York	L 67–85	Kayla Thornton (13)	Kayla Thornton (6)	Veronica Burton (6)	Barclays Center; 14,774	2–2
5	May 29	@ New York	L 77–82	Janelle Salaün (18)	Janelle Salaün (13)	Julie Vanloo (8)	Barclays Center; 14,951	2–3

June : 7–4 (Home: 6–2; Road: 1–2)

Game	Date	Team	Score	High points	High rebounds	High assists	Location Attendance	Record
6	June 1	Minnesota	L 75–86	Veronica Burton (21)	Kayla Thornton (7)	Julie Vanloo (4)	Chase Center; 18,064	2–4
7	June 5	@ Phoenix	L 77–86	Veronica Burton (16)	Temi Fágbénlé (11)	Julie Vanloo (5)	PHX Arena; 9,943	2–5
8	June 7	Las Vegas	W 95–68	Kayla Thornton (22)	Billings, Thornton (11)	Veronica Burton (12)	Chase Center; 18,064	3–5
9	June 9	@ Los Angeles	W 89–81 (OT)	Janelle Salaün (21)	Temi Fágbénlé (13)	Julie Vanloo (8)	Crypto.com Arena; 10,921	4–5
10	June 14	Seattle	W 76–70	Kayla Thornton (22)	Kayla Thornton (12)	Veronica Burton (9)	Chase Center; 18,064	5–5
11	June 17	@ Dallas	L 71–80	Monique Billings (18)	Monique Billings (8)	Veronica Burton (5)	College Park Center; 6,061	5–6
12	June 19	Indiana	W 88–77	Kayla Thornton (16)	Kayla Thornton (6)	Tiffany Hayes (5)	Chase Center; 18,064	6–6
13	June 22	Connecticut	W 87–63	Kayla Thornton (21)	Laeticia Amihere (12)	Stephanie Talbot (4)	Chase Center; 18,064	7–6
14	June 25	New York	L 78–81	Kate Martin (21)	Billings, Thornton (7)	Veronica Burton (10)	Chase Center; 18,064	7–7
15	June 27	Chicago	W 83–78	Kayla Thornton (29)	Laeticia Amihere (9)	Burton, Hayes (4)	Chase Center; 18,064	8–7
16	June 29	Seattle	W 84–57	Tiffany Hayes (21)	Laeticia Amihere (8)	Veronica Burton (5)	Chase Center; 18,064	9–7

July : 4–6 (Home: 1–1; Road: 3–5)

Game	Date	Team	Score	High points	High rebounds	High assists	Location Attendance	Record
17	July 5	@ Minnesota	L 71–82	Tiffany Hayes (23)	Kayla Thornton (10)	Burton, Hayes, Talbot (4)	Target Center; 8,771	9–8
18	July 7	@ Atlanta	L 81–90	Monique Billings (19)	Amihere, Billings, Thornton (6)	Veronica Burton (7)	Gateway Center Arena; 3,265	9–9
19	July 9	@ Indiana	W 80–61	Veronica Burton (21)	Burton, Hayes, Thornton (8)	Veronica Burton (6)	Gainbridge Fieldhouse; 16,798	10–9
20	July 12	@ Las Vegas	L 102–104	Hayes, Salaün (16)	Kayla Thornton (9)	Veronica Burton (8)	Michelob Ultra Arena; 10,070	10–10
21	July 14	Phoenix	L 77–78	Veronica Burton (17)	Monique Billings (9)	Veronica Burton (6)	Chase Center; 18,064	10–11
22	July 16	@ Seattle	L 58–67	Cecilia Zandalasini (12)	Veronica Burton (8)	Veronica Burton (4)	Climate Pledge Arena; 12,500	10–12
All-Star Game
23	July 25	Dallas	W 86–76	Tiffany Hayes (17)	Veronica Burton (9)	Tiffany Hayes (5)	Chase Center; 18,024	11–12
24	July 27	@ Connecticut	L 64–95	Iliana Rupert (13)	Fágbénlé, Hayes, Rupert (4)	Burton, Fágbénlé (3)	Mohegan Sun Arena; 8,294	11–13
25	July 29	@ Atlanta	W 77–75	Cecilia Zandalasini (18)	Cecilia Zandalasini (8)	Tiffany Hayes (5)	Gateway Center Arena; 3,265	12–13
26	July 31	@ Washington	W 68–67	Kate Martin (14)	Burton, Rupert (7)	Veronica Burton (10)	CareFirst Arena; 4,200	13–13

August : 8–5 (Home: 4–3; Road: 4–2)

Game	Date	Team	Score	High points	High rebounds	High assists	Location Attendance	Record
27	August 1	@ Chicago	W 73–66	Veronica Burton (18)	Janelle Salaün (9)	Veronica Burton (7)	Wintrust Arena; 7,714	14–13
28	August 3	@ Las Vegas	L 77–101	Iliana Rupert (17)	Laeticia Amihere (9)	Kaitlyn Chen (5)	Michelob Ultra Arena; 10,445	14–14
29	August 6	Las Vegas	L 72–78	Tiffany Hayes (14)	Tiffany Hayes (9)	Janelle Salaün (3)	Chase Center; 18,064	14–15
30	August 9	Los Angeles	W 72–59	Veronica Burton (16)	Janelle Salaün (8)	Tiffany Hayes (6)	Chase Center; 18,064	15–15
31	August 11	Connecticut	W 74–57	Hayes, Zandalasini (17)	Temi Fagbenle (9)	Veronica Burton (10)	Chase Center; 18,064	16–15
32	August 13	@ Washington	W 88–83	Veronica Burton (30)	Burton, Zandalasini (7)	Veronica Burton (7)	CareFirst Arena; 4,200	17–15
33	August 15	@ Chicago	W 90–59	Cecilia Zandalasini (20)	Janelle Salaün (6)	Rupert, Salaün, Zandalasini (3)	Wintrust Arena; 7,804	18–15
34	August 17	Atlanta	L 63–79	Veronica Burton (16)	Amihere, Salaün (5)	Veronica Burton (5)	Chase Center; 18,064	18–16
35	August 19	Phoenix	L 91–98	Veronica Burton (24)	Laeticia Amihere (7)	Veronica Burton (14)	Chase Center; 18,064	18–17
36	August 22	@ Phoenix	L 72–81	Janelle Salaün (15)	Laeticia Amihere (8)	Veronica Burton (8)	PHX Arena; 10,280	18–18
37	August 24	@ Dallas	W 90–81	Veronica Burton (25)	Fágbénlé, Salaün (9)	Veronica Burton (13)	College Park Center; 6,251	19–18
38	August 30	Washington	W 99–62	Janelle Salaün (20)	Amihere, Salaün (6)	Carla Leite (6)	Chase Center; 18,064	20–18
39	August 31	Indiana	W 75–63	Iliana Rupert (21)	Burton, Charles (7)	Veronica Burton (13)	Chase Center; 18,064	21–18

September : 2–3 (Home: 2–1; Road: 0–2)

Game	Date	Team	Score	High points	High rebounds	High assists	Location Attendance	Record
40	September 2	New York	W 66–58	Temi Fagbenle (16)	Veronica Burton (9)	Veronica Burton (9)	Chase Center; 18,064	22–18
41	September 4	Dallas	W 84–80	Janelle Salaün (19)	Billings, Charles (7)	Burton, Leite (5)	Chase Center; 18,064	23–18
42	September 6	Minnesota	L 72–78	Charles, Rupert, Salaün (15)	Charles, Salaün (8)	Veronica Burton (6)	Chase Center; 18,064	23–19
43	September 9	@ Seattle	L 73–74	Janelle Salaün (22)	Kaila Charles (9)	Veronica Burton (11)	Climate Pledge Arena; 12,500	23–20
44	September 11	@ Minnesota	L 53–72	Burton, Charles, Rupert, Zandalasini (8)	Janelle Salaün (11)	Veronica Burton (7)	Target Center; 8,824	23–21

2025 season schedule

Notes:

- Games highlighted in ██ represent Commissioner's Cup games.

=== Playoffs ===
2025 playoff game log
First round vs. Minnesota Lynx
Lost Series 0–2

Game	Date	Team	Score	High points	High rebounds	High assists	Location Attendance	Series
1	September 14	@ Minnesota	L 72–101	Burton, Zandalasini (14)	Janelle Salaün (6)	Veronica Burton (7)	Target Center; 8,821	0–1
2	September 17	Minnesota	L 74–75	Monique Billings (15)	Veronica Burton (6)	Veronica Burton (9)	SAP Center; 18,543	0–2

2025 playoff schedule

== Standings ==
#	Team	W	L	PCT	GB	Conf.	Home	Road	Cup
1	yx – Minnesota Lynx	34	10	.773	–	20–4	20–2	14–8	5–1
2	x – Las Vegas Aces	30	14	.682	4	16–8	17–5	13–9	2–4
3	x – Atlanta Dream	30	14	.682	4	15–6	16–6	14–8	3–2
4	x – Phoenix Mercury	27	17	.614	7	13–11	15–7	12–10	4–2
5	x – New York Liberty	27	17	.614	7	15–5	17–5	10–12	4–1
6	cx – Indiana Fever	24	20	.545	10	13–8	13–9	11–11	4–1
7	x – Seattle Storm	23	21	.523	11	12–12	10–12	13–9	4–2
8	x – Golden State Valkyries	23	21	.523	11	9–15	14–8	9–13	3–3
9	e – Los Angeles Sparks	21	23	.477	13	10–14	9–13	12–10	2–4
10	e – Washington Mystics	16	28	.364	18	8–12	10–12	6–16	2–3
11	e – Connecticut Sun	11	33	.250	23	7–14	7–15	4–18	1–4
12	e – Chicago Sky	10	34	.227	24	4–17	6–16	4–18	1–4
13	e – Dallas Wings	10	34	.227	24	4–20	6–16	4–18	1–5

Notes

(#) – League Standing
c – Commissioner's Cup winners
y – Regular Season Champion
x – Clinched playoff berth
e – Eliminated from playoff contention
Source: Overall standings and Commissioner's Cup Standings

== Playoffs ==
First Round: Best-of-3
**1**	**Minnesota Lynx**	**2**
8	Golden State Valkyries	0
4	**Phoenix Mercury**	2
5	New York Liberty	1
2	**Las Vegas Aces**	**2**
7	Seattle Storm	1
3	Atlanta Dream	1
6	**Indiana Fever**	**2**

Semifinals: Best-of-5
1	Minnesota Lynx	1
4	**Phoenix Mercury**	**3**
2	**Las Vegas Aces**	**3**
6	Indiana Fever	2

Finals: Best-of-7
4	Phoenix Mercury	0
2	**Las Vegas Aces**	**4**

- **Bold** – Series winner
- Italic – Team with home-court-advantage

== Statistics ==
Legend
GP	Games played	GS	Games started	MPG	Minutes per game	RPG	Rebounds per game
APG	Assists per game	SPG	Steals per game	BPG	Blocks per game	PPG	Points per game
FG%	Field-goal percentage	3P%	3-point field-goal percentage	FT%	Free-throw percentage	TO	Turnovers per game
PF	Fouls per game		Team leader		League leader

=== Regular season ===
Player	GP	GS	MPG	FG%	3P%	FT%	RPG	APG	SPG	BPG	TO	PPG
Kayla Thornton	22	22	30.1	36.2%	28.2%	82.9%	7.0	1.5	1.3	0.2	1.6	14.0
Veronica Burton	44	44	29.4	38.7%	34.5%	87.8%	4.4	6.0	1.1	0.6	2.1	11.9
Janelle Salaün	36	33	27.0	40.6%	36.6%	80.6%	5.1	1.2	0.6	0.1	1.5	11.3
Tiffany Hayes	26	24	26.9	41.8%	40.6%	80.0%	3.8	3.0	0.5	0.2	1.9	11.7
Cecilia Zandalasini	19	10	23.7	44.7%	40.7%	87.5%	2.9	1.7	0.9	0.2	1.3	10.5
Temi Fagbenle	39	38	23.7	50.2%	19.4%	72.2%	4.9	1.6	0.9	0.6	1.5	7.4
Iliana Rupert	21	11	23.1	43.8%	44.2%	93.8%	3.9	1.6	0.6	0.6	1.0	9.3
Julie Vanloo	9	2	20.0	29.2%	21.1%	83.3%	1.9	4.1	0.7	—	2.6	4.6
Kaila Charles	18	8	19.3	46.3%	53.0%	81.8%	4.5	0.9	1.1	0.2	1.2	7.4
Monique Billings	26	8	18.2	47.7%	27.8%	67.9%	4.5	0.5	0.6	0.8	0.8	7.3
Carla Leite	37	6	17.2	38.7%	17.3%	83.8%	1.3	2.0	0.7	0.1	1.5	7.2
Stephanie Talbot	16	10	16.8	33.9%	25.0%	64.3%	3.3	2.0	0.6	0.1	1.2	3.6
Kate Martin	42	4	16.4	32.3%	31.0%	78.0%	2.7	1.0	0.4	0.1	0.8	6.2
Laeticia Amihere	29	0	13.3	45.6%	14.3%	77.8%	4.3	0.9	0.6	0.4	1.1	5.4
Chloe Bibby	5	0	13.2	40.7%	42.1%	100.0%	2.8	0.6	0.6	—	—	6.4
Kaitlyn Chen	24	0	10.3	38.0%	33.3%	71.4%	0.9	1.0	0.2	—	0.8	2.0
Kyara Linskens	4	0	6.8	40.0%	0.0%	—	1.5	0.3	0.3	0.8	0.5	1.0
Bree Hall	3	0	4.0	33.3%	0.0%	33.3%	0.7	—	—	—	1.0	1.0
Aerial Powers	2	0	3.5	0.0%	—	100.0%	1.0	0.5	0.5	—	—	1.0

=== Playoffs ===
Player	GP	GS	MPG	FG%	3P%	FT%	RPG	APG	SPG	BPG	TO	PPG
Veronica Burton	2	2	35.0	28.0%	40.0%	100.0%	5.5	8.0	3.5	1.0	5.0	13.5
Janelle Salaün	2	2	34.5	50.0%	45.5%	80.0%	5.0	0.5	0.5	—	1.0	13.5
Cecilia Zandalasini	2	2	31.0	34.6%	33.3%	87.5%	4.5	2.5	1.0	—	2.5	14.0
Iliana Rupert	2	1	24.0	42.9%	33.3%	—	2.5	3.0	—	1.0	2.5	4.0
Kaila Charles	2	2	22.5	25.0%	50.0%	—	2.5	2.0	1.5	0.5	0.5	3.5
Temi Fagbenle	1	1	20.0	62.5%	0.0%	50.0%	3.0	3.0	—	—	1.0	12.0
Kate Martin	2	0	16.0	40.0%	37.5%	71.4%	1.5	1.0	—	0.5	0.5	8.0
Monique Billings	2	0	14.5	58.3%	—	100.0%	2.0	—	0.5	0.5	—	7.5
Carla Leite	2	0	8.0	0.0%	0.0%	100.0%	1.0	0.5	—	—	1.5	2.0
Laeticia Amihere	1	0	4.0	—	—	—	1.0	—	—	—	—	—
Kaitlyn Chen	1	0	4.0	100.%	—	—	1.0	1.0	—	—	—	2.0

== Awards and honors ==
Recipient	Award	Date awarded	Ref.
Veronica Burton	AP Most Improved Player	September 12	
Veronica Burton	WNBA Most Improved Player	September 15	
Veronica Burton	WNBA All-Defensive Second Team	October 8	
Natalie Nakase	Coach of the Month – June	July 3	
Natalie Nakase	AP Coach of the Year	September 12	
Natalie Nakase	WNBA Coach of the Year	September 17	
Janelle Salaün	AP All-Rookie Team	September 12	
Janelle Salaün	WNBA All-Rookie Team	September 29	
Kayla Thornton	Western Conference Player of the Week	June 17	
Kayla Thornton	WNBA All-Star Reserve	July 7	
