= 2024 WNBA expansion draft =

6th WNBA expansion draft

General information
- Sport: Basketball
- Date: December 6, 2024
- Location: San Francisco Museum of Modern Art; San Francisco, California
- Network: ESPN

Overview
- League: WNBA
- Expansion team: Golden State Valkyries

The Women's National Basketball Association (WNBA) held their sixth expansion draft on December 6, 2024, for the Golden State Valkyries. This draft allowed the Golden State Valkyries to select players from the existing WNBA teams to fill their debut roster prior to the start of the 2025 WNBA season.

On September 30, 2024, the WNBA announced the expansion draft would be held on December 6, and televised on ESPN, and also announced the draft rules. Each existing WNBA team provided the league office with a list of all players to which it held contract rights as of the final day of the 2024 regular season. These 12 teams were allowed to protect a maximum of six players from their 2024 rosters (or for whom they held playing rights). The Valkyries were then permitted to select one unprotected player from each team's 2024 roster, but only one unrestricted free agent and that player could not have played under a "core player" contract for two or more seasons. During the draft, the Valkyries selected Monique Billings, who most recently had played for the Phoenix Mercury, as their sole unrestricted free agent draft pick.

Golden State was permitted to make trades prior to the expansion draft, including agreements to (1) select a given player and trade that player to another team, or (2) select or not select an available player from a given team. However, no such agreements were made public.

== Key ==
Pos.	G	F	C
Position	Guard	Forward	Center

^{+}	Denotes player who has been selected for at least one All-Star Game

== Expansion draft ==
The following players were drafted for the roster of the Valkyries from the league's existing teams on December 6, 2024:

Pick	Player	Position	Nationality	Former team	WNBA years (Note: Number of years played in the WNBA prior to the draft)	Career with the franchise (Note: Number of years played for expansion franchise that drafted player)	Ref.
1	Iliana Rupert	C	France	Atlanta Dream	2	2025–present	
2	María Conde	F	Spain	Chicago Sky	0	—	
3	Veronica Burton	G	United States	Connecticut Sun	3	2025–present	
4	Carla Leite	G	France	Dallas Wings	0	2025	
5	Temi Fágbénlé	C	United Kingdom	Indiana Fever	4	2025–present	
6	Kate Martin	G	United States	Las Vegas Aces	1	2025–present	
7	Stephanie Talbot	F	Australia	Los Angeles Sparks	6	2025	
8	Cecilia Zandalasini	F	Italy	Minnesota Lynx	3	2025–present	
9	Kayla Thornton ^{+}	F	United States	New York Liberty	9	2025–present	
10	Monique Billings	F	United States	Phoenix Mercury	7	2025–present	
11	No selection	—	—	Seattle Storm	—	—	
12	Julie Vanloo	G	Belgium	Washington Mystics	1	2025	
