= Carla Leite =

French basketball player (born 2004)

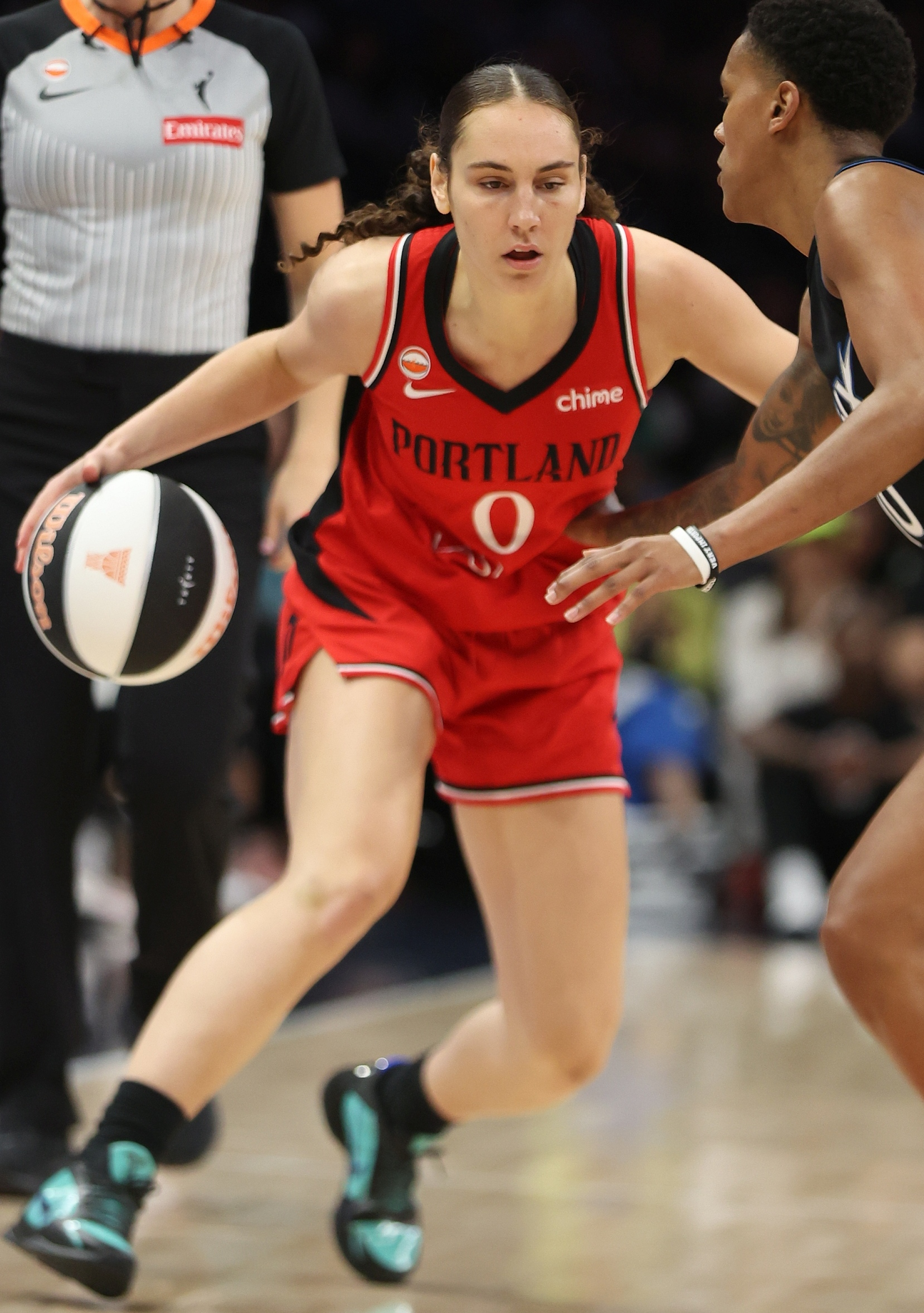
- Leite with the Portland Fire in 2026

No. 0 – Portland Fire
- Position: Guard
- League: WNBA

Personal information
- Born: April 16, 2004 (age 22) Poissy, Yvelines, France
- Listed height: 5 ft 9 in (1.75 m)
- Listed weight: 155 lb (70 kg)

Career information
- High school: Tony Parker Academy (France)
- WNBA draft: 2024: 1st round, 9th overall pick
- Drafted by: Dallas Wings
- Playing career: 2022–present

Career history
- 2022–2024: Tarbes
- 2024–2025: Villeneuve d'Ascq
- 2025: Golden State Valkyries
- 2025–2026: Casademont Zaragoza
- 2026–present: Portland Fire

Career highlights
- EuroCup Women champion (2025); EuroCup Women Finals MVP (2025)
- Stats at WNBA.com
- Stats at Basketball Reference

Carla Leite (born 16 April 2004) is a French professional basketball player for the Portland Fire of the Women's National Basketball Association (WNBA). She was selected ninth overall by the Dallas Wings in the 2024 WNBA draft.

== Early life ==
Leite was born on 16 April 2004. She grew up in Poissy, Yvelines, and played several sports growing up, including association football and tennis. She first tried out basketball at age nine and said she "started to get serious" beginning at age 13. She started with the club ES Lorguaise and later moved to Draguignan UC, where she started with the U11 team but quickly moved up to the U13. She moved an hour away from home at age 13 to join the club Pôle d'Antibes, and spent several seasons there.

Leite began attending Tony Parker Academy in 2019 while playing for the junior team of Lyon ASVEL. She played three years for Lyon and began receiving attention after scoring 27 points in the finals of the 2022 U18 French Cup, in a close loss to USO Mondeville.

== Professional career ==
=== France ===
==== Tarbes (2022–2024) ====
Soon after her performance in the French Cup, Leite signed her first professional contract at age 18, with Tarbes in the Ligue Féminine de Basketball (LFB), the top women's league in France. In the 2022–23 season, she averaged 11.8 points and 2.9 assists per game and was named the league's best young player. In her second season with Tarbes, Leite averaged 15.8 points, 5.5 assists and 2.5 rebounds and was named to the league all-star team.

==== Villeneuve d'Ascq (2024–2025) ====
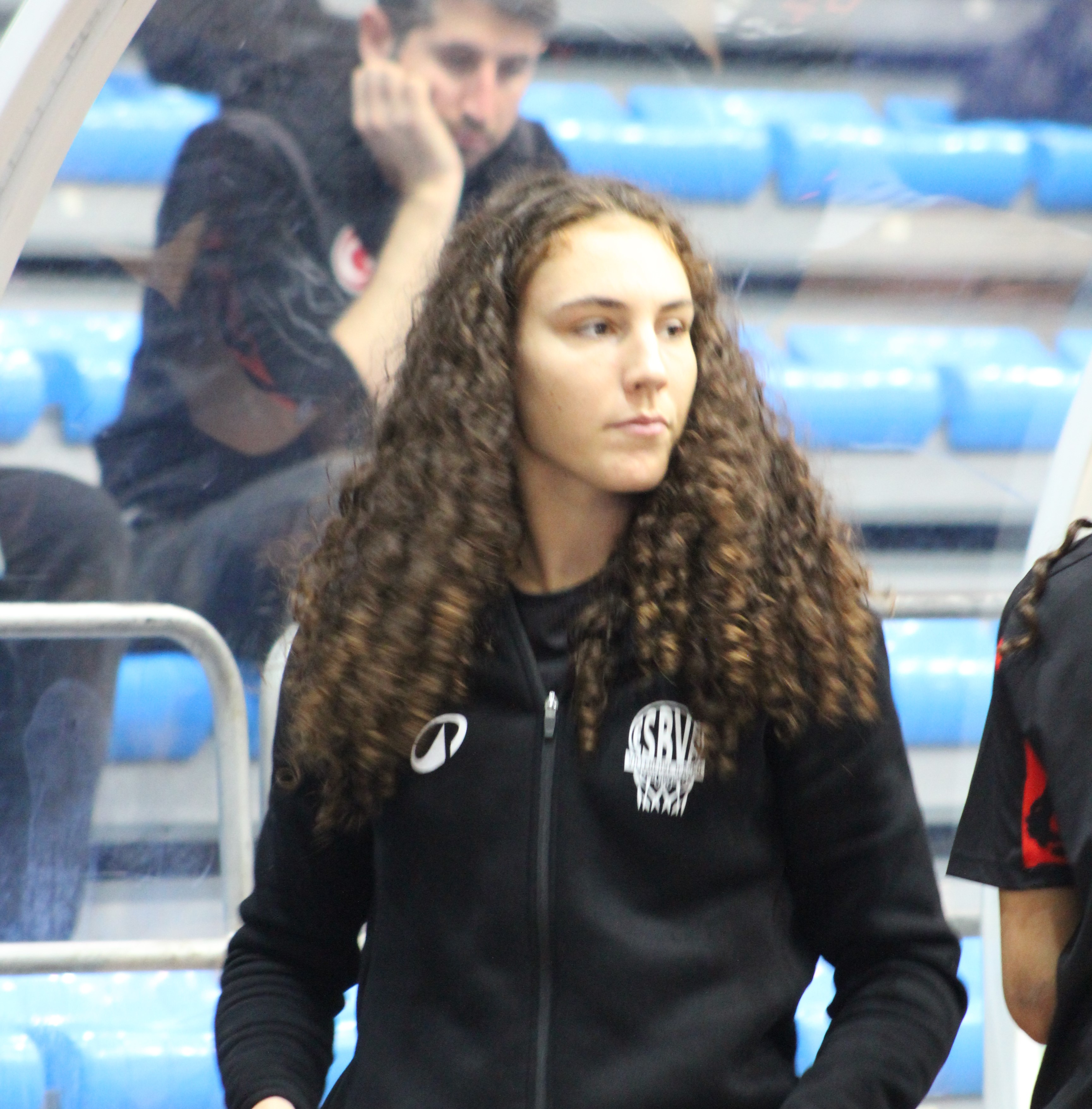
Leite with Villeneuve d'Ascq in 2024

In June 2024, Leite signed with Villeneuve d'Ascq. She led the team to a championship in the 2024-25 EuroCup, being named the Finals MVP after averaging 20.5 points, 6.0 assists, and 2.5 rebounds per game across the tie.

=== Spain ===
==== Zaragoza (2025–present) ====
In 2025, Leite signed a two-year contract with Casademont Zaragoza of the Liga Femenina de Baloncesto.

=== WNBA ===
Leite was selected in the first round (ninth overall) of the 2024 WNBA draft by the Dallas Wings. She chose to remain overseas for the 2024 season.

==== Golden State Valkyries (2025) ====
On 6 December 2024, Leite was selected as the Golden State Valkyries' pick from the Dallas Wings' roster in the 2024 WNBA expansion draft. She signed a rookie scale contract with the Valkyries on 21 February 2025. On 16 May, she made her debut in the franchise's first-ever WNBA game—a 67–84 loss to the Los Angeles Sparks—scoring 2 points in 11 minutes off the bench. On 21 May, she contributed 10 points in the franchise's first-ever win, a 76–74 victory over the Washington Mystics. On 23 May, she scored a career-high 19 points in an 82–73 win over the Sparks. On 14 June, she made her first career start, scoring 14 points in a 76–70 win over the Seattle Storm.

==== Portland Fire (2026–present) ====
On 3 April 2026, Leite was selected as the Portland Fire's pick from the Golden State Valkyries' roster in the 2026 WNBA expansion draft.

== International career ==
Leite first played internationally at the 2021 U17 3×3 European Cup She was selected for the 2022 FIBA U18 Women's European Championship but had to withdraw due to injury. She later competed at the 2023 FIBA U20 Women's European Championship, where she averaged 18.4 points and 4.3 assists while helping France win the title over Latvia, with Leite being named an all-star and the most valuable player of the tournament.

Leite was on an 18-player candidate list for the 2024 Paris Olympics, but she did not make the final 12-player roster.

== Career statistics ==
Legend
GP	Games played	GS	Games started	MPG	Minutes per game	RPG	Rebounds per game
APG	Assists per game	SPG	Steals per game	BPG	Blocks per game	PPG	Points per game
TO	Turnovers per game	FG%	Field-goal percentage	3P%	3-point field-goal percentage	FT%	Free-throw percentage
**Bold**	Career best	°	League leader

=== WNBA ===
==== Regular season ====
Stats current through end of 2025 season

WNBA regular season statistics
Year	Team	GP	GS	MPG	FG%	3P%	FT%	RPG	APG	SPG	BPG	TO	PPG
2025	Golden State	37	6	17.2	.387	.173	.838	1.3	2.0	0.7	0.1	1.5	7.2
**Career**	1 year, 1 team	37	6	17.2	.387	.173	.838	1.3	2.0	0.7	0.1	1.5	7.2

==== Postseason ====
Year	Team	GP	GS	MPG	FG%	3P%	FT%	RPG	APG	SPG	BPG	TO	PPG
2025	Golden State	2	0	8.0	.000	.000	1.000	1.0	0.5	0.0	0.0	1.5	2.0
**Career**	1 year, 1 team	2	0	8.0	.000	.000	1.000	1.0	0.5	0.0	0.0	1.5	2.0
