= Monique Billings =

American basketball player (born 1996)

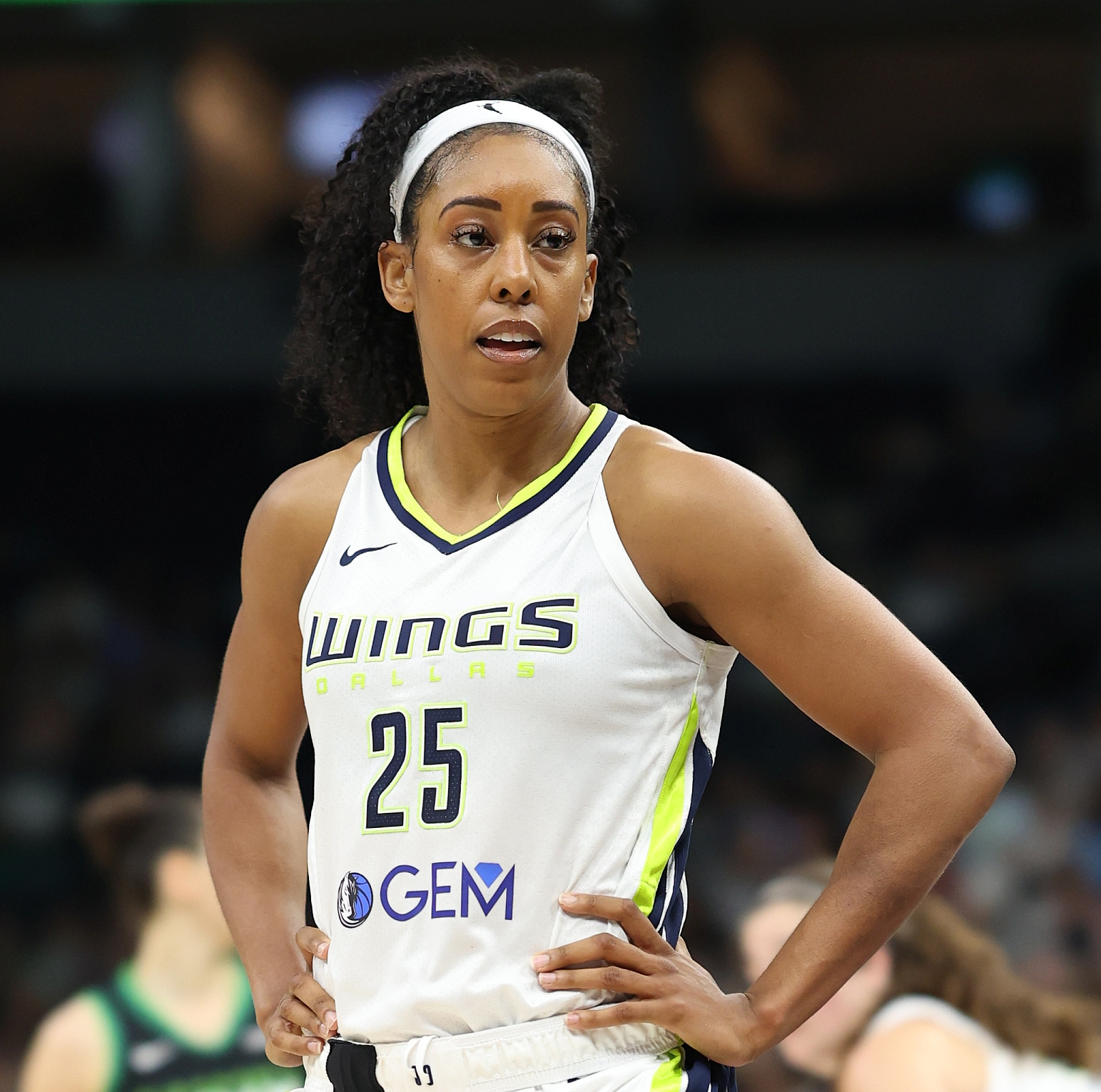
- Billings with the Dallas Wings in 2024

No. 25 – Indiana Fever
- Position: Power forward
- League: WNBA

Personal information
- Born: May 2, 1996 (age 30) Riverside, California, U.S.
- Listed height: 6 ft 4 in (1.93 m)
- Listed weight: 190 lb (86 kg)

Career information
- High school: Santiago (Corona, California)
- College: UCLA (2014–2018)
- WNBA draft: 2018: 2nd round, 15th overall pick
- Drafted by: Atlanta Dream
- Playing career: 2018–present

Career history
- 2018–2023: Atlanta Dream
- 2018–2019: Heilongjiang Dragons
- 2019: Asan Woori Bank Wibee
- 2019–2020: Elitzur Ramla
- 2020: Hatay BB
- 2020–2021: Nadezhda Orenburg
- 2021–2022: Townsville Fire
- 2022–2023: Besiktas
- 2023–2024: Dynamo Kursk
- 2024: Dallas Wings
- 2024: Phoenix Mercury
- 2024: Guangdong Vermilion Birds
- 2025: Golden State Valkyries
- 2025: Fenerbahçe
- 2026–present: Hive
- 2026–present: Indiana Fever

Career highlights
- 2× Pac-12 All-Defensive Team (2017, 2018); 2× All-Pac-12 (2017, 2018)
- Stats at Basketball Reference

Monique Charice Billings (born May 2, 1996) is an American professional basketball player for the Indiana Fever of the Women's National Basketball Association (WNBA), and the Breeze of Unrivaled. She played college basketball with the UCLA Bruins. Billings was selected 15th overall by the Atlanta Dream in the 2018 WNBA draft. As a child in elementary school, she attended Saint Edward Catholic School in Corona, California.

== College career ==
=== UCLA ===
Billings played basketball at Santiago High School in Corona, California. She was a 4-year letterman there and also participated in the high jump on the track and field team. Billings was ranked in the top 30 by many recruiting services coming out of high school. She also received an invite to the United States National Team Under-18 trials in 2014.

While at UCLA, Billings contributed from the start. In her freshman season; she played in 37 games for the Bruins and was named to the Pac-12 all-freshman team. During her sophomore season, she started all 35 games. She led the team to the NCAA Division I tournament (the "Sweet 16"), where they lost to Texas. Billings also led the team in rebounds that year and was named an honorable mention to the all Pac-12 team. Billings again started all 34 games for the Bruins in her junior year, again leading the team to the NCAA tournament. The Bruins again fell in the Sweet 16. Billings led the team in scoring that year and was named to the All Pac-12 team. During her senior season, Billings led the Pac-12 in rebounds, double-doubles, and offensive rebounds. She started 34 of 35 games for the Bruins, who reached the Elite Eight of the NCAA Tournament for the first time since 1999.

== Professional career ==
=== WNBA ===
==== Atlanta Dream (2018–2023) ====
Billings was drafted in the second round by the Atlanta Dream in the 2018 WNBA draft.

==== Dallas Wings (2024) ====
Billings signed with the Los Angeles Sparks in February 2024, but she ultimately didn't make the Sparks roster for the season and was waived during training camp.

With not making the Sparks roster, Billings was signed by the Dallas Wings to a hardship contract following their season opening, as Natasha Howard sustained an injury. Billings quickly was inserted into the Wings's starting lineup and became a force. In her second game with Dallas, against the Atlanta Dream on May 21, she scored 20 points and 10 rebounds. Natasha Howard returned from injury, but the Wings were dealt more injuries to Maddy Siegrist, Jaelyn Brown, and Satou Sabally, which allowed Billings to continue to stay in Dallas. Following the Olympic break, the Wings's players became healthy, which forced the Wings to have to release Billings from her hardship contract.

==== Phoenix Mercury (2024) ====
Billings signed a 7-Day Contract with the Phoenix Mercury on August 18, 2024. On August 25, 2024, Billings signed a rest-of-season contract with the Mercury.

==== Golden State Valkyries (2025) ====
On December 6, 2024, Billings was selected as the Golden State Valkyries' pick from the Phoenix Mercury's roster in the 2024 WNBA expansion draft.

==== Indiana Fever (2026–present) ====
On April 11, 2026, Billings was signed as a free agent by the Indiana Fever.

=== Unrivaled ===
On November 5, 2025, it was announced that Billings had been drafted by Hive BC for the 2026 Unrivaled season. She joined Breeze for the 2027 season.

=== Overseas ===
After the 2018 WNBA season, Billings played for the Asan Woori Bank Wibee of the Women's Korean Basketball League.

Billings signed a short-term contract with Fenerbahçe of the Turkish Super League for the 2025–26 season.

== National team career ==
Billings made her debut United States senior team start on March 12, 2026, featuring in a 91–48 win over Puerto Rico in the FIBA World Cup qualification tournament in San Juan, Puerto Rico.

== Career statistics ==
Legend
GP	Games played	GS	Games started	MPG	Minutes per game	RPG	Rebounds per game
APG	Assists per game	SPG	Steals per game	BPG	Blocks per game	PPG	Points per game
TO	Turnovers per game	FG%	Field-goal percentage	3P%	3-point field-goal percentage	FT%	Free-throw percentage
**Bold**	Career best	°	League leader

=== WNBA ===
==== Regular season ====
WNBA regular season statistics
Year	Team	GP	GS	MPG	FG%	3P%	FT%	RPG	APG	SPG	BPG	TO	PPG
2018	Atlanta	32	0	11.0	.441	—	.750	2.8	.4	.4	.0	**.4**	3.3
2019	Atlanta	29	2	19.1	.389	**1.000**	.783	6.9	.6	.6	.4	1.6	5.5
2020	Atlanta	22	16	**27.1**	.400	—	.761	**8.5**	1.2	1.1	.8	1.9	8.5
2021	Atlanta	31	9	23.9	.495	.000	.675	6.5	1.0	**1.2**	**1.0**	1.4	8.1
2022	Atlanta	23	8	17.4	.470	.000	.765	6.3	1.1	.8	.3	1.3	6.5
2023	Atlanta	39	9	16.7	.407	.000	**.836**	5.0	.8	.4	.3	.9	4.8
2024	Dallas	24	12	25.4	.475	.143	.804	6.6	**1.9**	.6	.5	2.1	**8.8**
2024	Phoenix	13	2	18.1	.434	.286	.800	4.2	.5	.9	.5	1.1	4.9
2025	Golden State	26	8	18.2	.477	.278	.679	4.5	.5	.6	.8	.8	7.3
2026	Indiana	**43**	**31**	18.7	**.516**	.278	.757	4.7	1.0	.8	.5	.8	6.5
**Career**	9 years, 5 teams	282	97	19.2	.454	.250	.756	5.5	.9	.7	.5	1.2	6.3

==== Playoffs ====
WNBA playoff statistics
Year	Team	GP	GS	MPG	FG%	3P%	FT%	RPG	APG	SPG	BPG	TO	PPG
2018	Atlanta	**5**	0	12.8	.474	—	.579	2.6	**.8**	.0	**.6**	.4	5.8
2023	Atlanta	2	**2**	**23.5**	.286	—	.625	**7.0**	.0	.5	.0	1.5	4.5
2024	Phoenix	2	0	14.0	**.800**	—	.000	3.5	.5	.5	.0	**.0**	4.0
2025	Golden State	2	0	14.5	.583	—	**1.000**	2.0	.0	.5	.5	**.0**	**7.5**
2026	Indiana	3	0	9.7	.750	—	—	2.0	.7	**1.3**	.0	.7	2.0
**Career**	5 years, 4 teams	14	2	14.1	.532	—	.586	3.1	.5	.5	.3	.5	4.8

=== International ===
==== EuroLeague ====
EuroLeague statistics
Year	Team	GP	GS	MPG	FG%	3P%	FT%	RPG	APG	SPG	BPG	TO	PPG
2020–21	(Russia) Nadezhda Orenburg	4	1	24.1	.405	.000	.880	6.5	.8	1.3	.3	2.5	13.0
2025–26	(Turkey) Fenerbahçe	2	1	25.2	.529	.000	.786	6.0	.5	2.5	1.0	1.5	14.5

=== College ===
NCAA statistics
Year	Team	GP	GS	MPG	FG%	3P%	FT%	RPG	APG	SPG	BPG	TO	PPG
2014–15	UCLA	**37**	2	16.5	.468	—	.477	5.0	.3	1.0	1.4	**1.6**	5.8
2015–16	UCLA	35	**35**	28.7	**.492**	—	.679	8.1	1.0	1.6	1.6	2.0	12.7
2016–17	UCLA	34	34	31.3	.472	—	.636	**10.5**	.9	**1.8**	**1.9**	**1.6**	**16.7**
2017–18	UCLA	35	34	**31.9**	.472	.000	**.716**	9.5	**1.2**	1.1	1.6	2.2	15.3
**Career**		141	105	26.9	.477	.000	.643	8.2	.8	1.4	1.6	1.8	12.5
