= Cecilia Zandalasini =

Italian basketball player (born 1996)

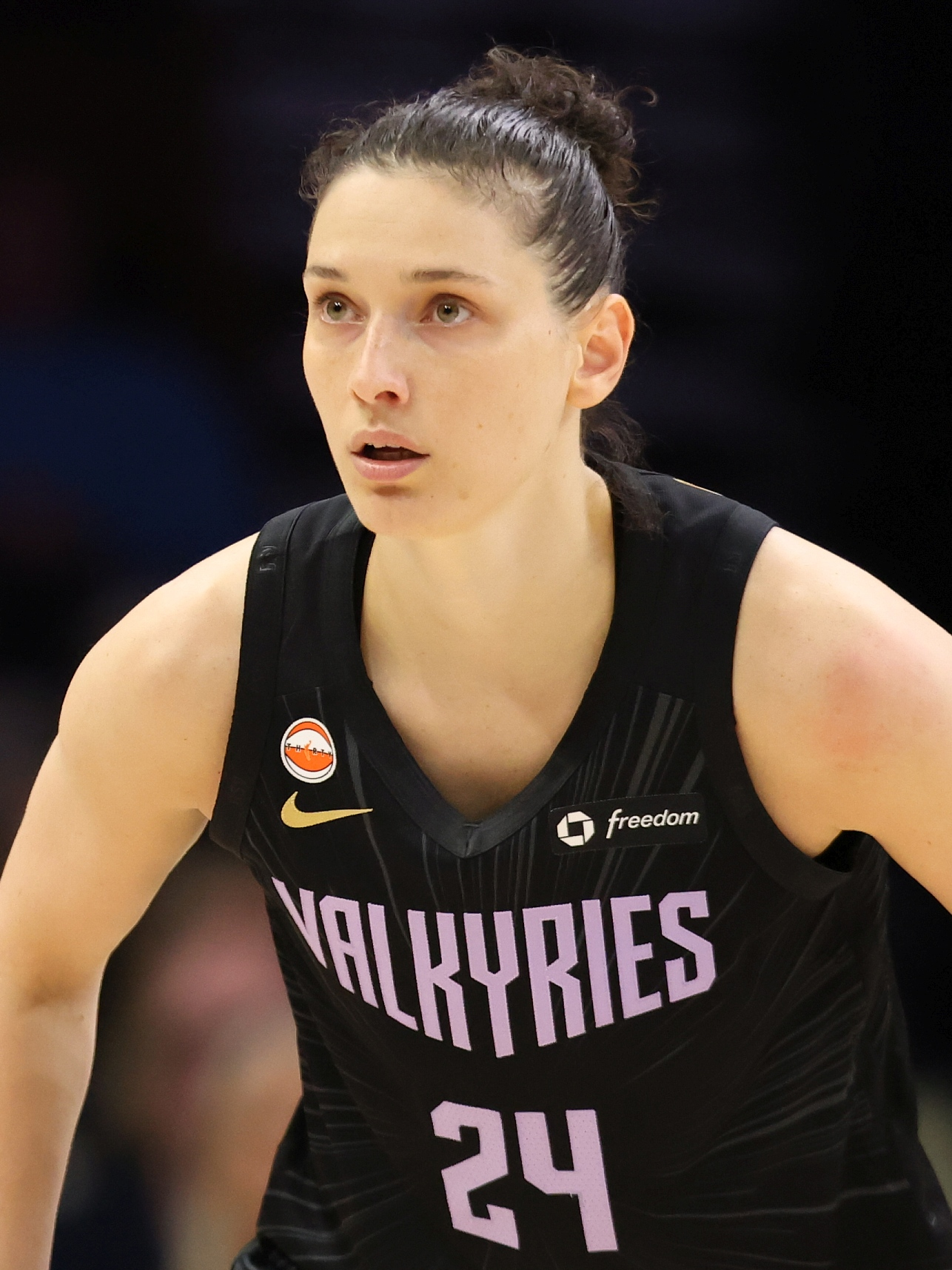
- Zandalasini with the Golden State Valkyries in 2026

No. 24 – Golden State Valkyries
- Position: Small forward
- League: WNBA

Personal information
- Born: 16 March 1996 (age 30) Broni, Italy
- Listed height: 6 ft 2 in (1.88 m)
- Listed weight: 175 lb (79 kg)

Career information
- Playing career: 2010–present

Career history
- 2013–2014: Geas Basket
- 2014–2018: PF Schio
- 2017–2018: Minnesota Lynx
- 2018–2021: Fenerbahçe
- 2021–2024: Virtus Bologna
- 2024: Minnesota Lynx
- 2024–2025: Galatasaray
- 2025–present: Golden State Valkyries
- 2025–present: PF Schio

Career highlights
- 2× WNBA champion (2017, 2026); WNBA Commissioner's Cup Champion (2024); 2016 FIBA Europe Under-20 Championship for Women MVP; 2× Turkish Super League champion (2019, 2021); 2× Turkish Cup champion (2019, 2020); Turkish Presidential Cup champion (2019); Italian Supercup champion (2023)
- Stats at Basketball Reference

Cecilia Zandalasini (Italian: [tʃeˈtʃiːlja ddzandalaˈziːni]; born 16 March 1996) is an Italian basketball player for the Golden State Valkyries of the Women's National Basketball Association (WNBA) and for Famila Basket Schio of the Lega Basket Femminile. She also plays for the Italian national team. She was the MVP of 2016 FIBA Europe Under-20 Championship for Women.

== Early life ==
Zandalasini was born on 16 March 1996 in Broni, Italy. She is the daughter of Roberto Zandalasini and Paola Lombardi. While playing with Geas Basket, she won six Italian youth club championships.

== Professional career ==
=== Europe ===
==== Geas Basket (2013–14) ====
At the age of 17, Zandalasini played as a guard under Geas Basket for the 2013–14 season. She led the team in points with a total of 314 across 20 games (15.7 PPG).

==== PF Schio (2014–2018) ====
Zandalasini has played with PF Schio since 2014. In Zandalasini's third season with the team in 2016–17, the team won the Coppa Italia and reached the Serie A1 playoff finals. The team continued to the EuroLeague postseason, where Zandalasini had a team high 13.5 PPG.

==== Fenerbahçe (2018–2021) ====
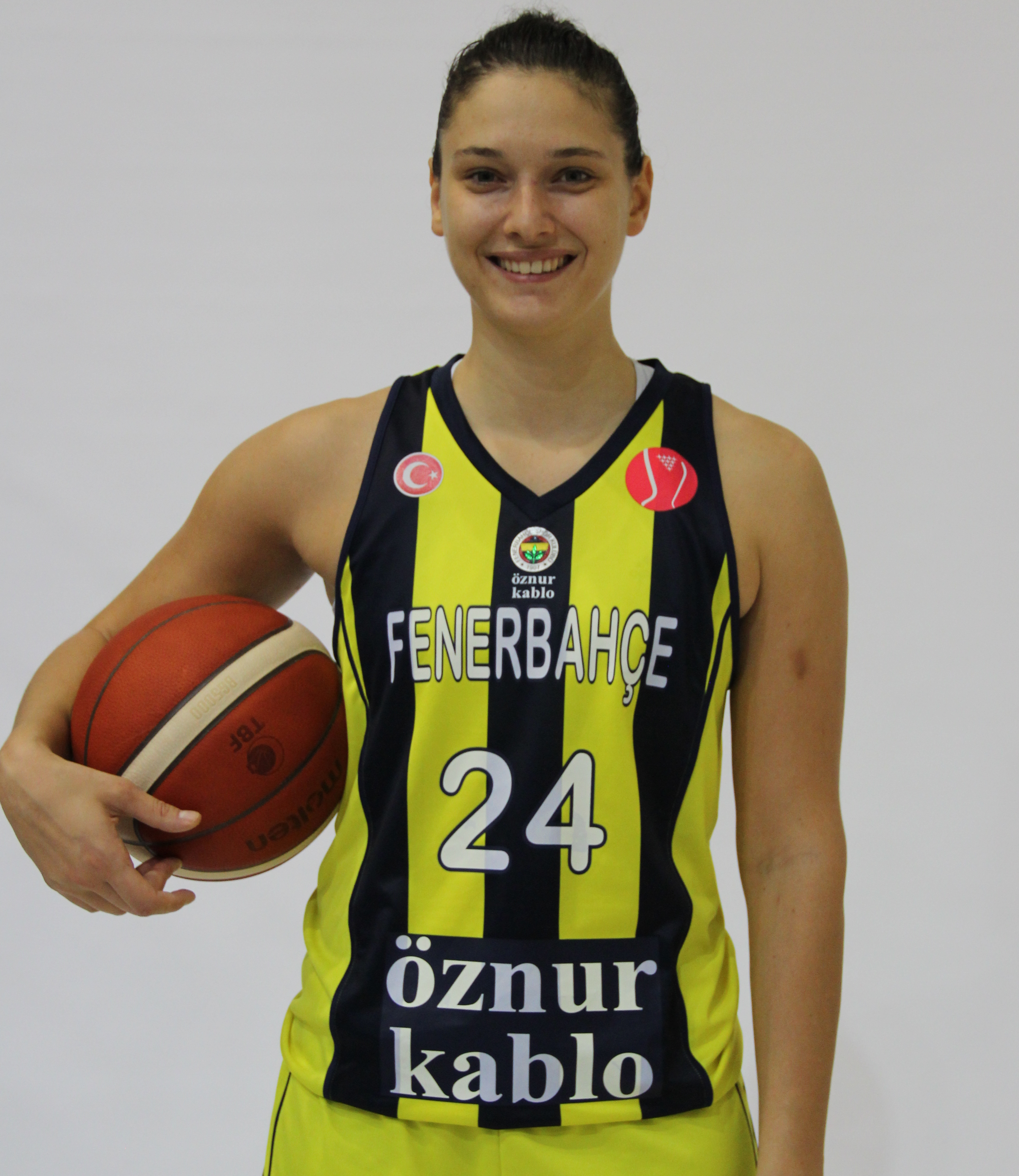
Zandalasini with Fenerbahçe in 2019

On 4 July 2018, she had signed a two-year deal with the Turkish women's basketball club, Fenerbahçe.

==== Virtus Bologna (2021–2024) ====
On 5 May 2021, Zandalasini signed a two-year deal with the Italian women's basketball club Virtus Bologna. Despite good premises, in November 2021 the team was eliminated in the group stage of the EuroCup. On 19 April 2022, during the national semi-finals against Reyer Venezia, Lino Lardo was fired and his assistant Angela Gianolla became the new head coach. The team ousted Reyer Venezia by 2–1 in the national semi-finals, reaching the finals for the first time in its history and qualifying for the EuroLeague Women. However, Virtus was defeated 3–1 by Famila Schio.

In the following season, Virtus played for the first time in the EuroLeague Women, but it was ousted in the regular season with a winning record of 5–9. The club ended the Italian championship's season at the first place but, once again, it lost the national finals against Famila Schio by 2–0.

==== Galatasaray (2024–2025) ====
On 24 July 2024, Zandalasini signed with Galatasaray of the Turkish Women's Basketball Super League (TKBL). Galatasaray club said goodbye to the player on 28 May 2025, by publishing a thank you message.

==== Second stint with PF Schio (2025–present) ====
In 2025, Zandalasini returned to Schio.

=== WNBA ===
==== Minnesota Lynx (2017–2018) ====
With only three games left in their 2017 regular season, the Minnesota Lynx signed Zandalasini as an unrestricted free agent on 28 August 2017. Zandalasini was only able to play 18:37 of the remainder of the regular season and 11 during the playoffs, which the Lynx won.

On 7 February 2018, it was announced that the Lynx would re-sign Zandalasini for the 2018 season. Zandalasini became a breakout player during the season after a buzzer-beating play against the New York Liberty in their 16 June game. She has subsequently seen more minutes of play, establishing herself as a fit for the sixth woman role.

Zandalasini did not play with the Lynx during their 2019 season due to her international team commitments and an ankle injury.

On 29 February 2020, the Lynx announced they would re-sign Zandalasini for the 2020 season in a non-disclosed deal. However she did not play any games for the Lynx during the shortened 2020 season.

==== Minnesota Lynx second stint (2024) ====
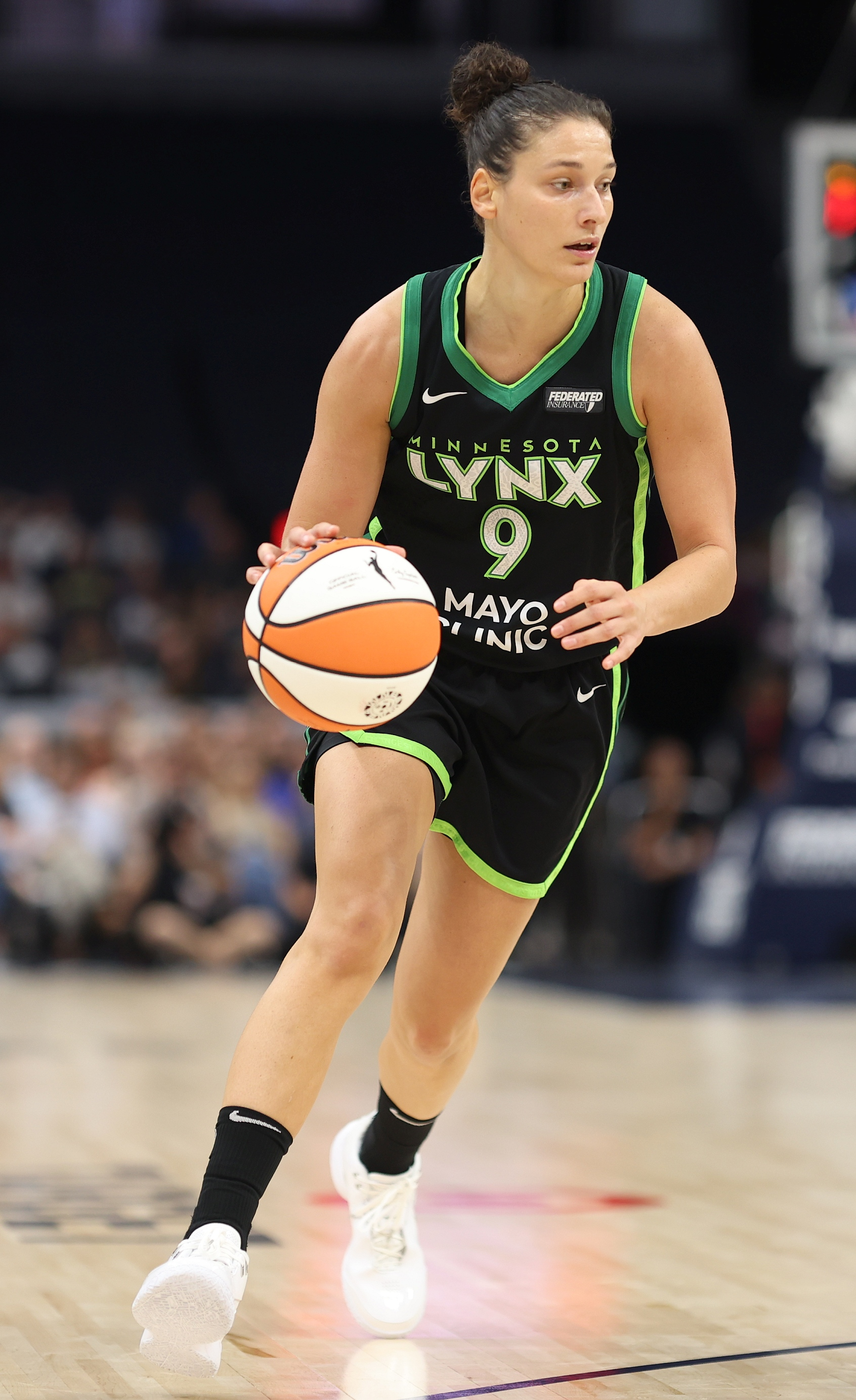
Zandalasini playing for Minnesota Lynx in 2024

On April 19, 2024, Zandalasini signed with a training camp contract with the Minnesota Lynx. On 14 May, it was announced that she made the final roster.

==== Golden State Valkyries (2025–present) ====
On 6 December 2024, Zandalasini was selected as the Golden State Valkyries' pick from the Minnesota Lynx' roster in the 2024 WNBA expansion draft.

On April 7, 2026, she signed a one-year deal with the Golden State Valkyries, ahead of the 2026 WNBA season.

== National team career ==
At EuroBasket Women 2017 she averaged 19.0 points (2nd in event) and 9.6 rebounds (3rd in event) and earned a spot on the All-Tournament Team. Jeff Taylor of FIBA.com called her performance "the greatest FIBA EuroBasket Women debut of all time".

== Career statistics ==
Legend
GP	Games played	GS	Games started	MPG	Minutes per game	RPG	Rebounds per game
APG	Assists per game	SPG	Steals per game	BPG	Blocks per game	PPG	Points per game
TO	Turnovers per game	FG%	Field-goal percentage	3P%	3-point field-goal percentage	FT%	Free-throw percentage
**Bold**	Career best	°	League leader

†	Denotes seasons in which Zandalasini won a WNBA championship

=== WNBA ===
==== Regular season ====
WNBA regular season statistics
Year	Team	GP	GS	MPG	FG%	3P%	FT%	RPG	APG	SPG	BPG	TO	PPG
2017^{†}	Minnesota	3	0	6.3	.250	—	—	.3	.0	.0	.0	**.7**	.7
2018	Minnesota	29	6	16.5	.409	.383	.840	1.9	1.1	.3	.0	1.1	5.7
2019	Did not appear in league												
2020	Did not appear in league (opted out)												
2021	Did not appear in league												
2022	Did not appear in league												
2023	Did not appear in league												
2024	Minnesota	**40**°	0	12.2	**.453**	**.443**	.621	1.2	1.1	.4	**.2**	.8	4.6
2025	Golden State	19	10	**23.7**	.447	.407	**.875**	**2.9**	**1.7**	**.9**	**.2**	1.3	**10.5**
2026	Golden State	37	**34**	19.0	.393	.324	.826	2.1	**1.7**	**.9**	**.2**	1.4	8.6
**Career**	5 years, 2 teams	128	50	16.7	.418	.377	.795	1.8	1.3	.6	.2	1.1	6.8

==== Playoffs ====
WNBA playoff statistics
Year	Team	GP	GS	MPG	FG%	3P%	FT%	RPG	APG	SPG	BPG	TO	PPG
2017^{†}	Minnesota	5	0	2.2	**1.000**	—	—	.0	.2	.0	.0	**.0**	.4
2018	Minnesota	1	1	25.0	.250	**.333**	—	1.0	.0	**1.0**	**1.0**	2.0	3.0
2024	Minnesota	**11**	0	9.5	.370	.250	.500	1.2	.4	.2	.0	.5	2.3
2025	Golden State	2	**2**	**31.0**	.346	**.333**	**.875**	**4.5**	**2.5**	**1.0**	.0	2.5	**14.0**
**Career**	4 years, 2 teams	19	3	10.7	.362	.292	.750	1.2	.5	.3	.1	.7	3.1
