= Stephanie Talbot =

Australian basketball player (born 1994)

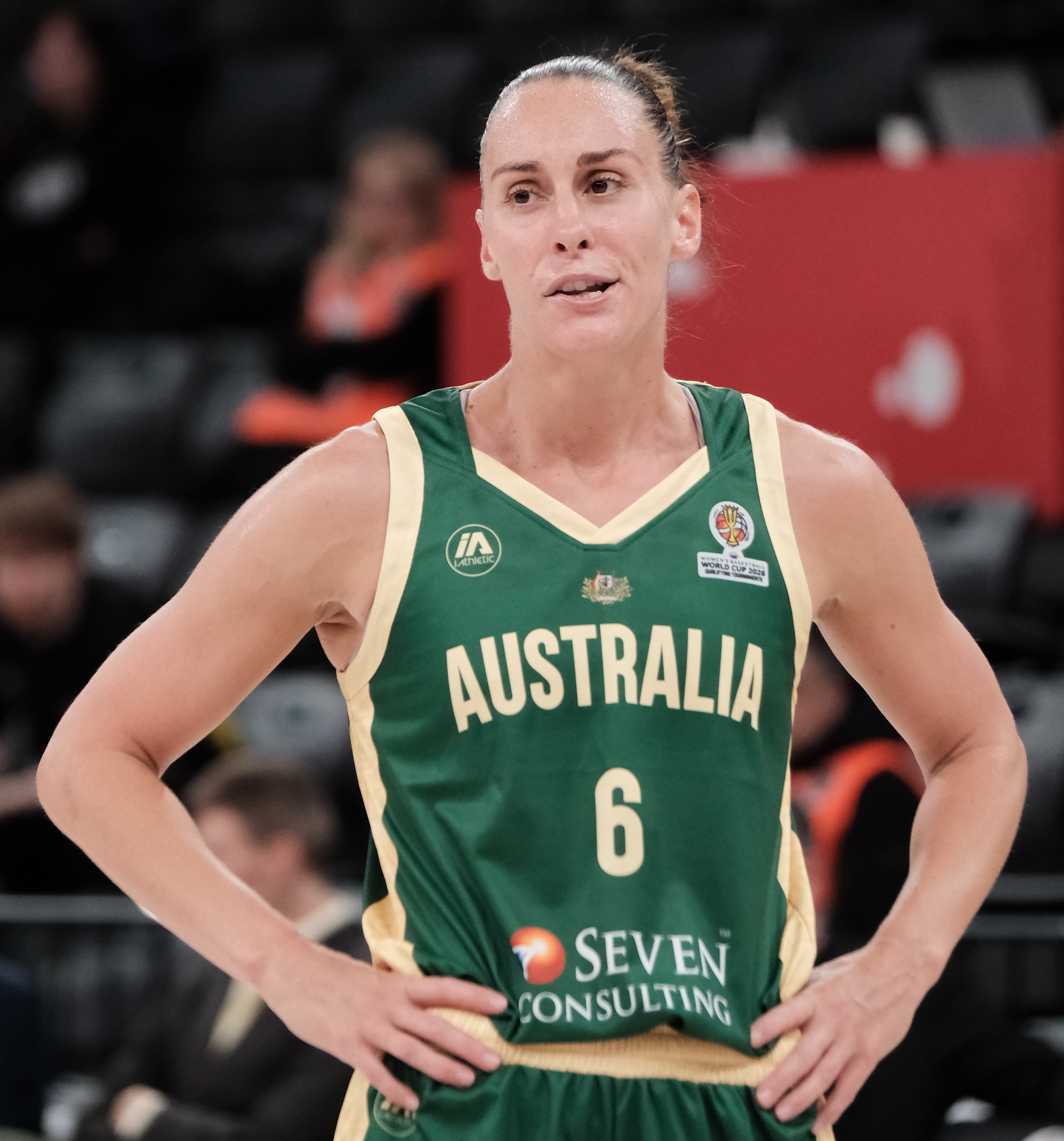
- Talbot in 2026

No. 7 – Las Vegas Aces
- Position: Forward
- League: WNBA

Personal information
- Born: 15 June 1994 (age 32) Katherine, Northern Territory, Australia
- Listed height: 6 ft 2 in (1.88 m)
- Listed weight: 192 lb (87 kg)

Career information
- WNBA draft: 2014: 3rd round, 33rd overall pick
- Drafted by: Phoenix Mercury
- Playing career: 2011–present

Career history
- 2011–2014: Adelaide Lightning
- 2014–2016: Canberra Capitals
- 2016–2017: Gorzów Wielkopolski
- 2017–2018: Phoenix Mercury
- 2017–2018: USO Mondeville
- 2018–2019: Melbourne Boomers
- 2019–2020: Minnesota Lynx
- 2019–present: Adelaide Lightning
- 2021–2022: Seattle Storm
- 2023–2024: Los Angeles Sparks
- 2025: Golden State Valkyries
- 2025: New York Liberty
- 2026–present: Las Vegas Aces

Career highlights
- Commissioner's Cup champion (2021); WNBL MVP (2020); 2× WNBL Defensive Player of the Year (2020, 2023); 2× All-WNBL First Team (2020, 2022); 2× All-WNBL Second Team (2019–20, 2023); WNBL Rookie of the Year (2013); WNBL Assists Leader (2022); FIBA Women's World Cup All-Tournament First Team (2022); FIBA Women's World Cup All-Tournament Second Team (2026)
- Stats at Basketball Reference
Medals
Women's basketball
Representing Australia
Olympic Games
| Bronze medal – third place | 2024 Paris | Team |
FIBA World Cup
| Silver medal – second place | 2018 Spain |
| Bronze medal – third place | 2022 Australia |
FIBA Asia Cup
| Bronze medal – third place | 2019 Bangalore |
Oceania Championships
| Gold medal – first place | 2015 Australia / New Zealand |
Commonwealth Games
| Gold medal – first place | 2018 Gold Coast | Team |

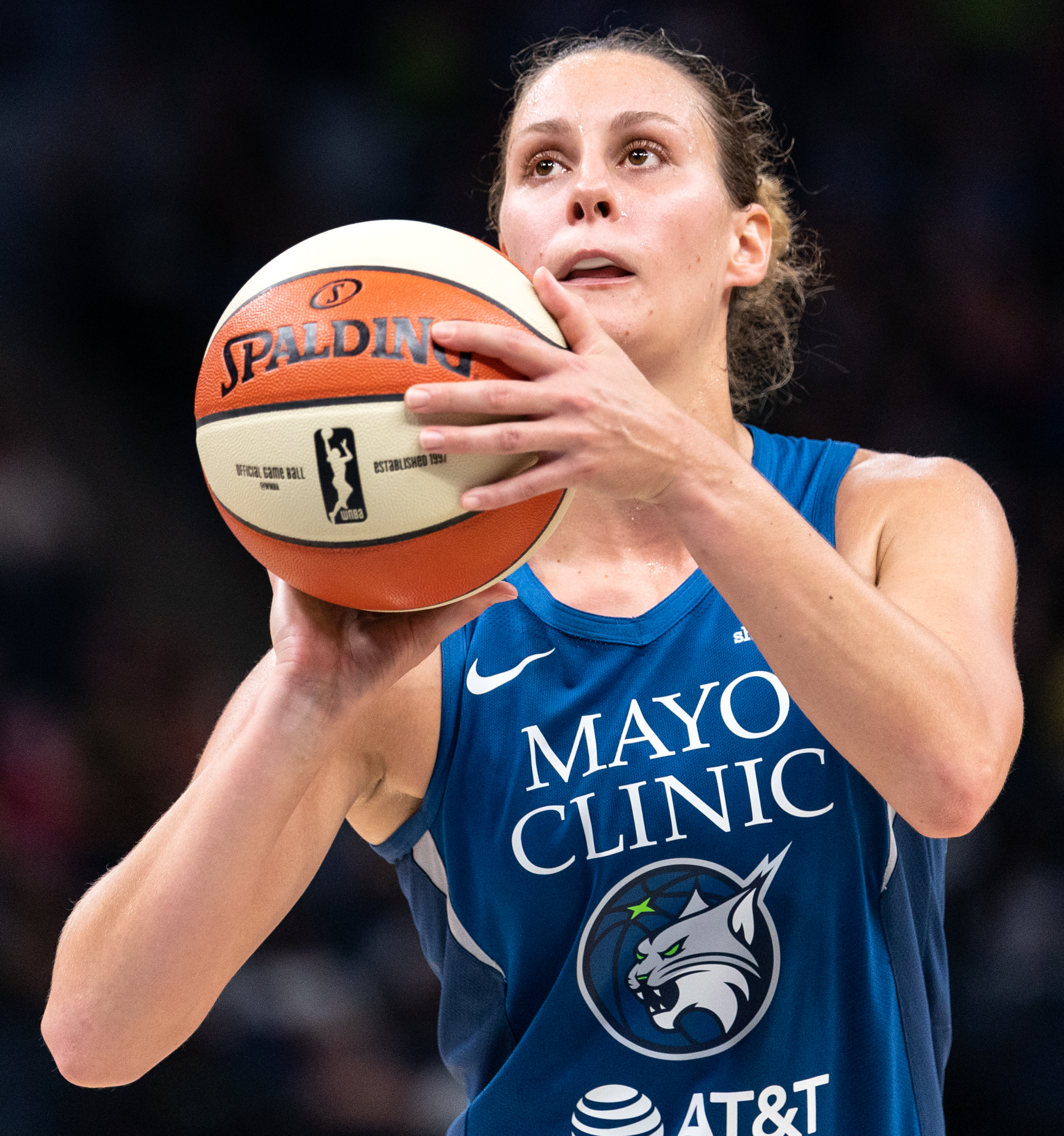

Stephanie Talbot (born 15 June 1994) is an Australian professional basketball player for the Las Vegas Aces of the Women's National Basketball Association (WNBA) and for the Adelaide Lightning of the Women's National Basketball League (WNBL).

Talbot was a member of the Australian women's basketball team (Opals) at the 2020 Tokyo Olympics, where the Opals were eliminated after losing to the USA in the quarterfinals. At the 2024 Summer Olympics she earned a bronze medal with the Australian team.

== Early life ==
Talbot was born in Katherine, Northern Territory.

== Career ==
=== WNBL ===
Talbot began her career at just the age of 17, playing with the Adelaide Lightning for the 2011–12 WNBL season. In just her second season, Talbot was recognised as one of the brightest prospects in the Women's National Basketball League (WNBL), winning the 2013 Betty Watson Rookie of the Year award. In accepting her award, Talbot was asked what she had learned from playing with Olympians Suzy Batkovic, Laura Hodges and Jennifer Screen, and she replied "Shitloads".

In 2018, Talbot returned to the league after signing with the Melbourne Boomers. This was her first season back after spending two seasons overseas in Europe.

In 2019, it was announced Talbot would re-join the Adelaide Lightning, returning to both her home state and her first WNBL team.

In 2020, Talbot re-signed with the Adelaide Lightning for her second consecutive season.

In June 2023, Talbot re-signed with the Lightning for four more seasons.

=== WNBA ===
In 2014, Talbot nominated for the WNBA draft, where she was selected in the third round (33rd overall) by the Phoenix Mercury. Talbot opted to play for the Canberra Capitals for the WNBL 2014-15 season. In 2017, the Phoenix Mercury re-acquired Talbot.

In 2019, Talbot was traded to the Minnesota Lynx after two seasons with the Mercury. In the off-season, she was traded to the New York Liberty for draft pick Erica Ogwumike.

After electing to sit-out the 2020 season, Talbot's rights remained with the Liberty. In February 2021, the Liberty traded their negotiating rights to the Seattle Storm. Talbot would subsequently sign a training camp contract with the Storm. She played for the Storm for two seasons.

On 1 February 2023, Talbot signed a two-year contract with the Los Angeles Sparks. She missed the 2023 WNBA season due to an ACL injury sustained while playing in Australia. On 22 August 2024, Talbot signed a one-year contract extension with the Sparks.

On 6 December 2024, Talbot was selected as the Golden State Valkyries' pick from the Sparks' roster in the 2024 WNBA expansion draft. On 13 July 2025, Talbot was waived by the Valkyries.

On 21 July 2025, Talbot signed with the Liberty.

As of the 2026 WNBA season, Talbot currently plays for the Las Vegas Aces.

== National team ==
=== Youth Level ===
Talbot made her international debut for the Sapphires at the 2009 FIBA Under-16 Oceania Championship in Brisbane. Later in 2013, Talbot was a member of the bronze medal winning team at the World Championship held in Lithuania. At that tournament, Talbot was named to the World Championship All-Star Five.

=== Senior Level ===
Talbot is a current member of the Australian Women's basketball training squad. At official senior FIBA tournaments, Talbot has played for the Opals at the 2015 Oceania Women's Championship, 2016 Olympic Games and 2018 World Cup.

Talbot, like all the other members of the 2020 Tokyo Olympics Opals women's basketball team, had a difficult tournament. The Opals lost their first two group stage matches. They looked flat against Belgium and then lost to China in heartbreaking circumstances. In their last group match the Opals needed to beat Puerto Rico by 25 or more in their final match to progress. This they did by 27 in a very exciting match. However, they lost to the United States in their quarterfinal 79 to 55.

== Career statistics ==
Legend
| GP | Games played | GS | Games started | MPG | Minutes per game | RPG | Rebounds per game |
| APG | Assists per game | SPG | Steals per game | BPG | Blocks per game | PPG | Points per game |
| TO | Turnovers per game | FG% | Field-goal percentage | 3P% | 3-point field-goal percentage | FT% | Free-throw percentage |
| **Bold** | Career best | ° | League leader |

=== WNBA ===
==== Regular season ====
WNBA regular season statistics
| Year | Team | GP | GS | MPG | FG% | 3P% | FT% | RPG | APG | SPG | BPG | TO | PPG |
|---|---|---|---|---|---|---|---|---|---|---|---|---|---|
| 2014 | Did not appear in WNBA | | | | | | | | | | | | |
| 2015 | Did not appear in WNBA | | | | | | | | | | | | |
| 2016 | Did not appear in WNBA (Olympics) | | | | | | | | | | | | |
| 2017 | Phoenix | 34 | 24 | **17.9** | .415 | .381 | .652 | 2.7 | 1.6 | .7 | .3 | .9 | 4.4 |
| 2018 | Phoenix | 31 | 8 | 14.6 | .464 | .386 | **.905** | 1.9 | 1.3 | .4 | .3 | .9 | 3.7 |
| 2019 | Minnesota | 33 | 10 | 17.0 | .370 | .326 | .871 | 2.4 | 1.2 | **.9** | .3 | 1.3 | 5.2 |
| 2020 | Did not play (opted out) | | | | | | | | | | | | |
| 2021 | Seattle | 30 | 9 | **17.9** | **.483** | **.415** | .750 | 2.9 | 1.6 | .5 | .4 | 1.6 | **5.7** |
| 2022 | Seattle | 34 | 1 | 16.1 | .464 | .397 | .583 | 3.1 | 1.3 | .7 | .3 | 1.1 | 5.0 |
| 2023 | Did not play (injury) | | | | | | | | | | | | |
| 2024 | Los Angeles | 37 | 10 | 16.2 | .395 | .260 | .690 | 2.7 | **2.1** | .5 | **.5** | 1.0 | 3.5 |
| 2025 | Golden State | 16 | 10 | 16.8 | .339 | .250 | .643 | **3.3** | 2.0 | .6 | .1 | 1.2 | 3.6 |
| 2025 | New York | 22 | 0 | 12.4 | .422 | .333 | .643 | 2.2 | 1.5 | .5 | .2 | 1.0 | 2.5 |
| 2026 | Las Vegas | **44**° | **43** | 17.3 | **.483** | .299 | .684 | 2.6 | 1.0 | .7 | .3 | **.7** | 4.0 |
| **Career** | 8 years, 7 teams | 281 | 115 | 16.4 | .432 | .343 | .714 | 2.6 | 1.5 | .6 | .3 | 1.0 | 4.3 |

==== Playoffs ====
WNBA playoff statistics
| Year | Team | GP | GS | MPG | FG% | 3P% | FT% | RPG | APG | SPG | BPG | TO | PPG |
|---|---|---|---|---|---|---|---|---|---|---|---|---|---|
| 2017 | Phoenix | 4 | 0 | 5.7 | **.750** | **.500** | **1.000** | .5 | .3 | .0 | .0 | .5 | 2.0 |
| 2018 | Phoenix | 4 | **4** | **27.1** | .474 | .333 | .600 | **5.3** | **2.8** | **1.0** | .0 | 2.2 | 6.3 |
| 2019 | Minnesota | 1 | 0 | 14.9 | .500 | **.500** | – | 1.0 | 1.0 | .0 | .0 | 1.0 | 5.0 |
| 2021 | Seattle | 1 | 0 | 17.0 | .500 | .000 | .000 | 4.0 | .0 | **1.0** | 1.0 | **.0** | 6.0 |
| 2022 | Seattle | **6** | 2 | 21.3 | .448 | **.500** | .600 | 4.3 | 1.7 | .5 | .5 | 1.0 | 6.2 |
| 2025 | New York | 1 | 0 | 9.0 | .000 | .000 | .000 | .0 | .0 | .0 | .0 | **.0** | .0 |
| 2026 | Las Vegas | 4 | 4 | 24.3 | .450 | .375 | .750 | .3 | 1.5 | .3 | **1.3** | .8 | **6.8** |
| **Career** | 7 years, 5 teams | 21 | 10 | 18.9 | .470 | .395 | .650 | 3.2 | 1.4 | .4 | .4 | 1.0 | 5.1 |

== See also ==
- List of Australian WNBA players
- WNBL Rookie of the Year Award
