= Kayla Thornton =

American basketball player (born 1992)

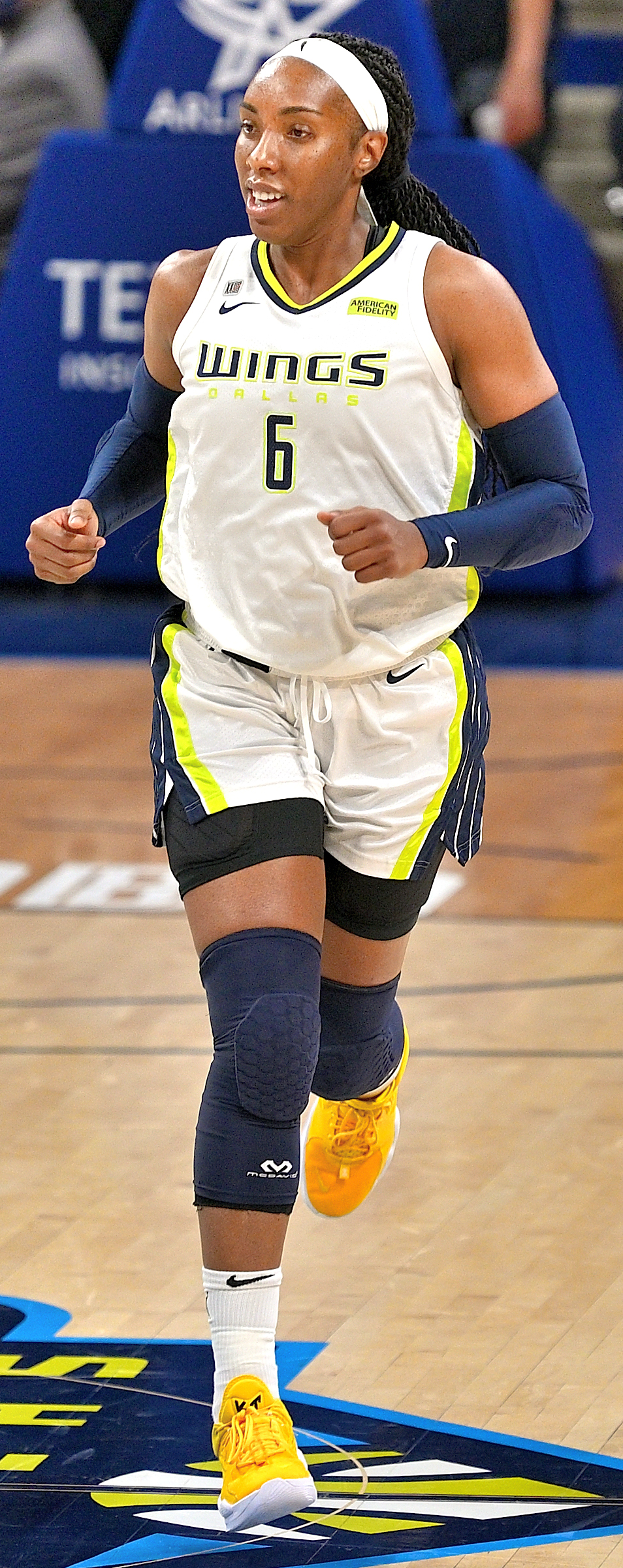
- Thornton with the Dallas Wings in 2021

No. 5 – Golden State Valkyries
- Position: Small forward / power forward
- League: WNBA

Personal information
- Born: October 20, 1992 (age 34) Germany
- Listed height: 6 ft 1 in (1.85 m)
- Listed weight: 190 lb (86 kg)

Career information
- High school: Irvin (El Paso, Texas)
- College: UTEP (2010–2014)
- WNBA draft: 2014: undrafted
- Playing career: 2014–present

Career history
- 2014: Montaneras de Morovis
- 2014–2015: Maccabi Ramat Hen
- 2015: Washington Mystics
- 2016: Cangrejeras de Santurce
- 2016–2017: Bucheon Hana 1Q
- 2017–2022: Dallas Wings
- 2018–2020: Cheongju KB Stars
- 2020–2021: Al Ahly
- 2021–2022: Reyer Venezia
- 2022–2023: Southside Flyers
- 2023–2024: New York Liberty
- 2023–2024: Dynamo Kursk
- 2024: Çukurova Basketbol
- 2025–present: Golden State Valkyries

Career highlights
- 2x WNBA champion (2024, 2026); WNBA Commissioner's Cup Champion (2023); WNBA All-Star (2025); WKBL champion (2019); WKBL MVP (2019); WKBL Import Player of the Year (2019); First-team All-CUSA (2014); 2x CUSA All-Defensive Team (2013, 2014)
- Stats at Basketball Reference

Kayla Bianca Thornton (born October 20, 1992) is an American professional basketball player for the Golden State Valkyries of the Women's National Basketball Association (WNBA) and for Rose of Unrivaled. She has previously played in the WNBA for the Dallas Wings and New York Liberty, with whom she won the 2024 WNBA Championship. In college, Thornton played for the University of Texas at El Paso.

== Career ==
From 2010 to 2014, Thornton played for the University of Texas at El Paso (UTEP). She was El Paso's all-time leading scorer and led the team to a record 29 wins in their 2011-12 season.

Thornton was not selected in the 2014 WNBA draft. She signed with the Washington Mystics for the 2015 season and played in 10 games. She returned to the WNBA for the 2017 season, signing with the Dallas Wings. She spent six seasons in Dallas before being traded on January 16, 2023 to the New York Liberty in a three-team deal. Thornton played a significant role as a sixth man, and helped propel the team to the 2023 and 2024 WNBA Finals, the latter of which they would win.

On December 6, 2024, Thornton was selected as the Golden State Valkyries' pick from the New York Liberty's roster in the 2024 WNBA expansion draft. She started all 22 of her appearances for Golden State in 2025, averaging 14.0 points, 7.0 rebounds, and 1.5 assists en route to her first career All-Star selection. On July 25, 2025, Thornton was ruled out for the remainder of the season after undergoing right knee surgery.

Thornton is known for her defensive play, and her ability to guard players in any position. In the WNBA offseason, Thornton has played in Australia, Egypt, Israel, Italy, Puerto Rico, Russia and South Korea.

== Career statistics ==
Legend
GP	Games played	GS	Games started	MPG	Minutes per game	RPG	Rebounds per game
APG	Assists per game	SPG	Steals per game	BPG	Blocks per game	PPG	Points per game
TO	Turnovers per game	FG%	Field-goal percentage	3P%	3-point field-goal percentage	FT%	Free-throw percentage
**Bold**	Career best	°	League leader

†	Denotes season(s) in which Thornton won a WNBA championship

=== WNBA ===
==== Regular season ====
WNBA regular season statistics
Year	Team	GP	GS	MPG	FG%	3P%	FT%	RPG	APG	SPG	BPG	TO	PPG
2015	Washington	10	0	8.8	.333	.000	.667	2.1	.1	.3	.3	**.5**	2.2
2016	Did not play (waived)												
2017	Dallas	34	1	17.2	.412	.279	.800	3.3	.9	.6	.2	.7	6.8
2018	Dallas	34	32	28.6	.447	.355	.860	4.0	**1.8**	1.0	.4	1.1	9.2
2019	Dallas	27	25	**30.4**	.343	.272	**.931**	5.3	**1.8**	.9	.3	1.6	10.4
2020	Dallas	22	14	25.3	.429	.347	.875	5.1	.8	.9	.2	1.1	7.3
2021	Dallas	31	25	27.6	.421	.349	.849	5.6	1.5	.8	.2	1.0	7.5
2022	Dallas	36	35	29.2	**.471**	.329	.829	5.9	**1.8**	1.1	**.6**	1.2	8.0
2023	New York	40°	0	17.3	.433	.313	.767	3.5	.7	.7	.3	**.5**	4.5
2024^{†}	New York	40°	11	20.3	.379	**.357**	.846	2.6	.7	.7	.2	.6	5.5
2025	Golden State	22	22	30.1	.362	.282	.829	**7.0**	1.5	**1.3**	.2	1.6	**14.0**
2026	Golden State	**44**°	**44**°	24.3	.361	.347	.903	4.5	.7	.7	.3	.7	7.7
**Career**	11 years, 4 teams	340	209	24.0	.398	.324	.846	4.4	1.1	.8	.3	.9	7.6
**Career**	All-Star	1	0	25.2	.357	.273	1.000	11.0	5.0	1.0	.0	.0	15.0

==== Playoffs ====
WNBA playoff statistics
Year	Team	GP	GS	MPG	FG%	3P%	FT%	RPG	APG	SPG	BPG	TO	PPG
2017	Dallas	1	0	6.0	.000	.000	—	1.0	1.0	.0	.0	**.0**	.0
2018	Dallas	1	1	**30.0**	**.571**	.000	—	3.0	.0	.0	.0	**.0**	8.0
2021	Dallas	1	1	16.0	.000	.000	—	2.0	.0	.0	.0	**.0**	.0
2022	Dallas	3	**3**	26.3	.526	**.500**	**1.000**	**4.7**	**1.3**	**.3**	**.7**	1.0	**8.3**
2023	New York	10	0	10.1	.444	.400	**1.000**	1.5	.3	.1	.2	.3	3.2
2024^{†}	New York	**11**	0	12.5	.333	.176	**1.000**	1.5	.1	.3	.3	.1	2.0
2025	Golden State	Did not play (injury)											
**Career**	6 years, 2 teams	27	5	13.7	.405	.289	1.000	1.9	.3	.2	.3	.3	3.2

=== College ===
NCAA statistics
Year	Team	GP	GS	MPG	FG%	3P%	FT%	RPG	APG	SPG	BPG	TO	PPG
2010–11	UTEP	30	12	19.9	.428	.143	.678	5.8	.6	1.1	.2	**1.1**	7.0
2011–12	UTEP	32	32	24.9	**.480**	**.381**	.730	7.3	.9	1.1	.4	1.2	9.8
2012–13	UTEP	32	31	31.2	.410	.285	.705	8.7	1.2	1.9	.4	1.9	15.3
2013–14	UTEP	**34**	**33**	**31.3**	.430	.277	**.777**	**10.1**	**2.0**	**2.6**	**1.0**	2.4	**19.5**
**Career**		128	108	27.0	.433	.285	.736	8.1	1.2	1.7	.5	1.7	13.1
