= Temi Fagbenle =

British-American basketball player (born 1992)

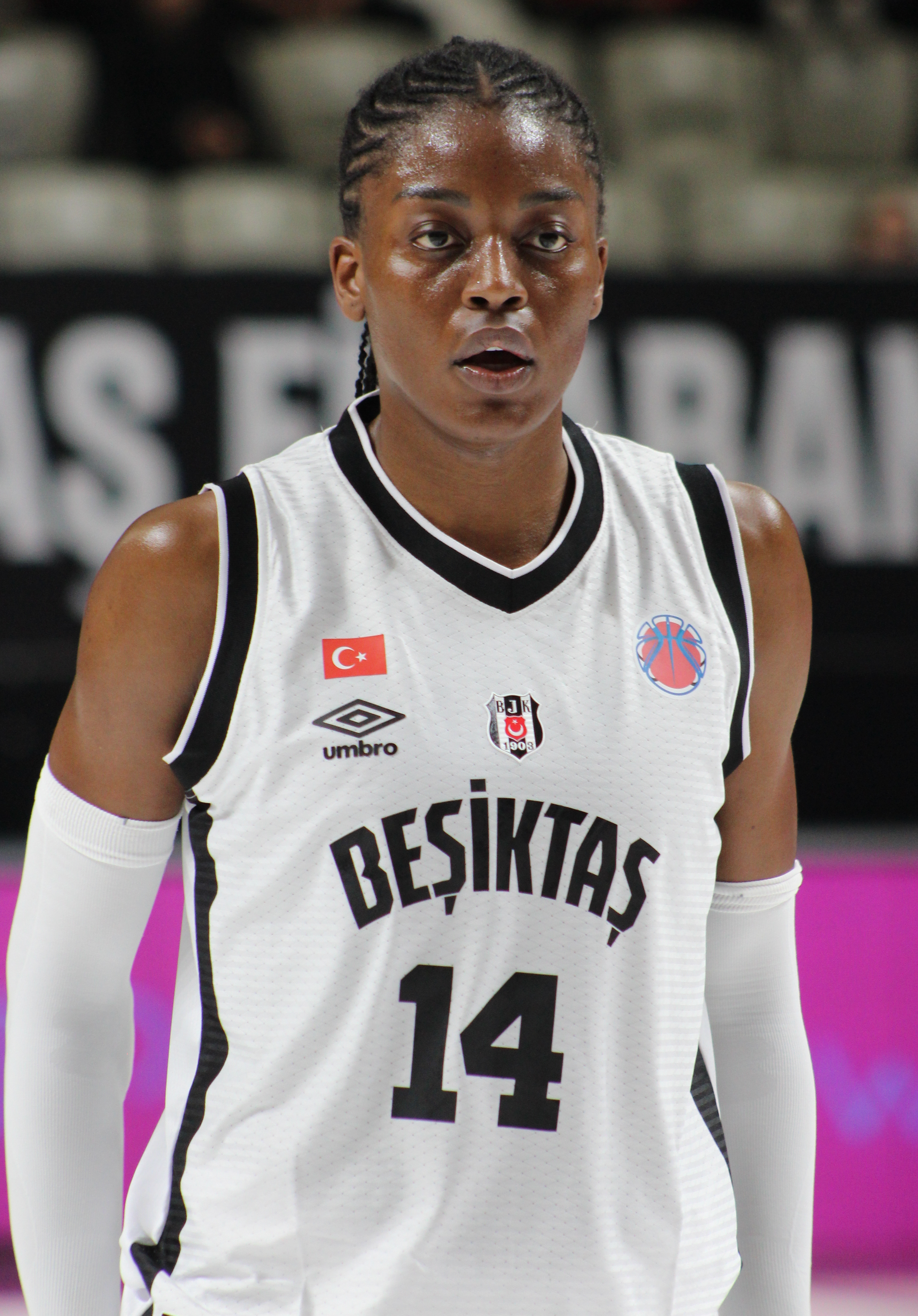
- Fagbenle with Beşiktaş in 2024

No. 14 – Toronto Tempo
- Position: Forward
- League: WNBA

Personal information
- Born: 8 September 1992 (age 34) Baltimore, Maryland, U.S.
- Listed height: 6 ft 4 in (1.93 m)
- Listed weight: 180 lb (82 kg)

Career information
- High school: Copthall School (London, UK); Blair Academy (Blairstown, New Jersey)
- College: Harvard (2011–2015); USC (2015–2016)
- WNBA draft: 2016: 3rd round, 35th overall pick
- Drafted by: Minnesota Lynx
- Playing career: 2017–present

Career history
- 2017–2019: Minnesota Lynx
- 2017–2019: CCC Polkowice
- 2019: BOTAŞ
- 2019–2020: Perfumerías Avenida
- 2020–2021: Reyer Venezia
- 2021–2022: Çukurova Basketbol
- 2022–2023: ZVVZ USK Praha
- 2023–2024: London Lions
- 2024: Indiana Fever
- 2024–2025: Beşiktaş
- 2025: Golden State Valkyries
- 2026–present: Lunar Owls BC
- 2026–present: Toronto Tempo

Career highlights
- EuroCup champion (2024); WBBL Trophy champion (2024); WBBL MVP (2023, 2024); WBBL All-Star MVP (2024); Czech champion (2023); Turkish Cup winner (2021); Lega Basket Femminile champion (2021); Copa de la Reina champion (2020); Polish Championship MVP 2019; 3× Polish champion (2017-2019); WNBA champion (2017); All Pac-12 (2016); First-team All-Ivy League (2014); Ivy League Rookie of the Year (2013); McDonald's All-American (2011)
- Stats at Basketball Reference

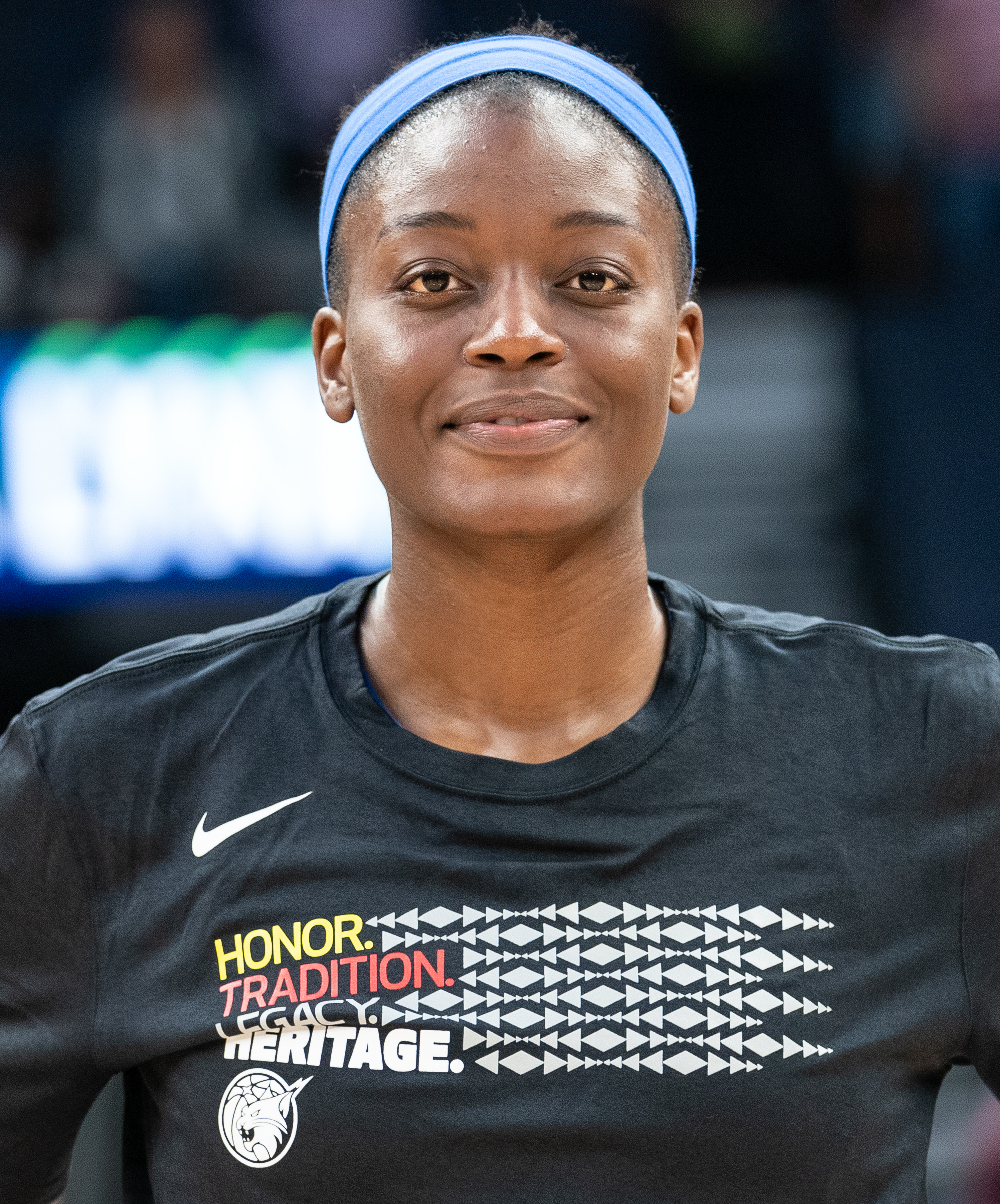
Fagbenle in 2019

Tèmítọ́pẹ́ Títílọlá "Temi" Fágbénlé (born 8 September 1992) is an American-born Nigerian-British professional basketball player who has, most recently, featured for the Toronto Tempo of the Women's National Basketball Association (WNBA) and for Lunar Owls of Unrivaled. She has represented the Great Britain women's team since 2012, making her competitive debut at the 2012 Summer Olympics.

== High school career ==
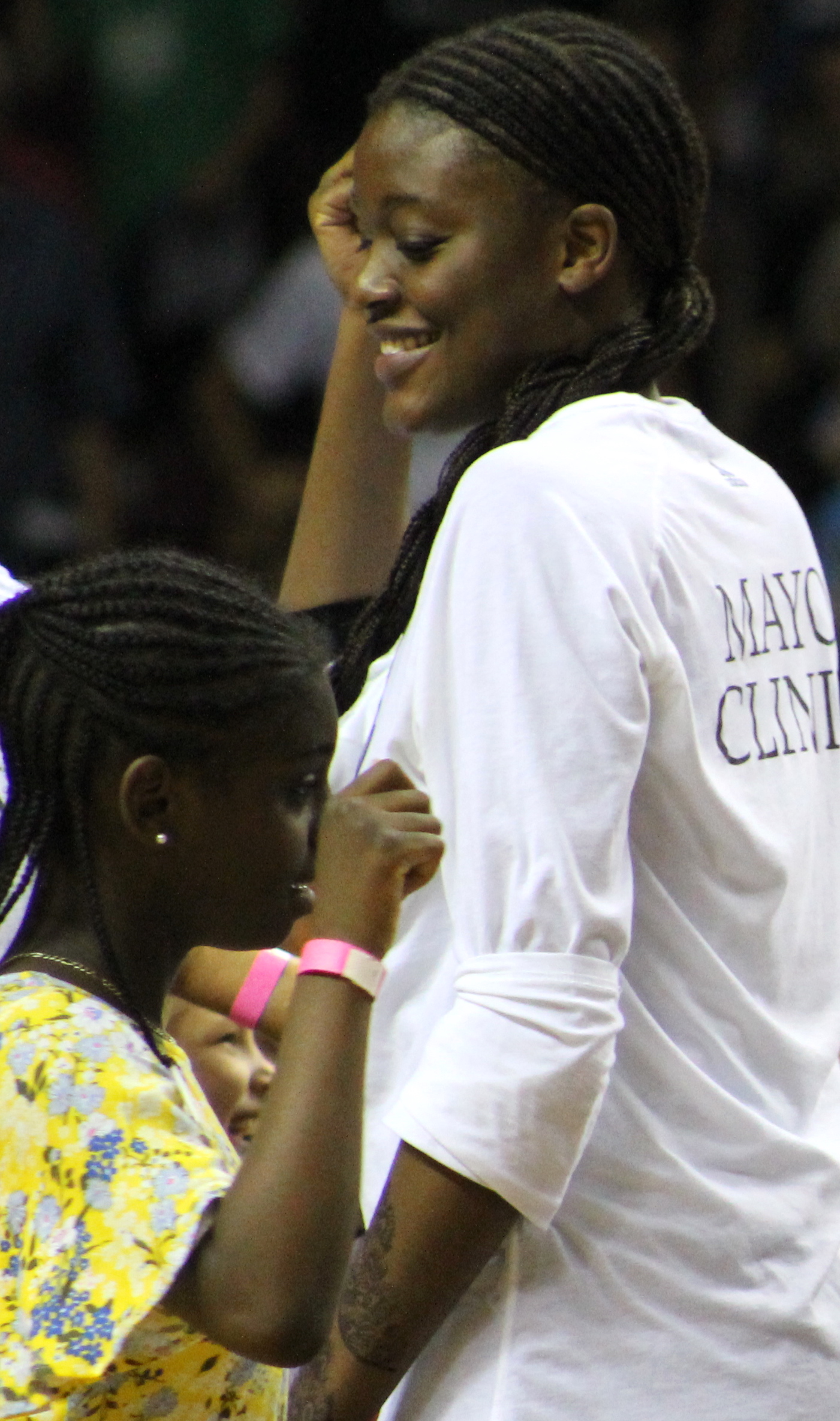
Fagbenle dancing with a fan in 2017

During her time at Blair Academy, Fagbenle was voted on to the McDonald's All American High School team.

== Professional career ==
Fagbenle has spent much of her professional career competing in major European leagues, as well as participating in North American leagues during WNBA seasons.

She has won national championships in Italy, Czechia, Poland, USA and the UK as well as the EuroCup in 2024 with the London Lions.

Her maiden regular season stint was spent with Polish and EuroLeague side Polkowice, claiming back-to-back domestic league titles and earning league MVP honours in 2019. She split the following campaign between Turkey and Spain, landing the Spanish Cup with CB Avenida Salamanca, and then lifting the Italian Lega Basket Femminile crown with Venezia in 2021.

Fagbenle secured the Turkish Cup with Mersin the following campaign, the Czech League title with USK Praha in 2023 and then returned to the UK for a one-season stint for 2023-24 with the London Lions.

In her home city, she was the league MVP as part of the Lions team which landed all four major domestic trophies in the WBBL - and became the first British team to win a European prize by defeating Besiktas in the final, averaging 16.4 points and 6.8 rebounds across the campaign.

She joined Besiktas in 2024 before a short spell in China with Henan, spending her 2026 regular season in the USA with the Lunar Owls BC of the Unrivaled league.

=== WNBA ===
==== Minnesota Lynx (2017–2019) ====
In her WNBA rookie season in 2017, she won the WNBA championship as a member of the Minnesota Lynx, becoming the first British player to win the title.

==== Indiana Fever (2024) ====
In January 2024, Fagbenle was signed by the Indiana Fever to a training camp contract. She made the final roster and appeared in the first eight regular season games (24 minutes / 9.1 points / 5.6 rebounds) during the first month of the season for the Fever before suffering a left foot injury. Fagbenle played a valuable role in transition, often able to get down court rapidly ahead of the opposing team to catch Caitlin Clark's cross-court passes in transition for a basket and score. However, injuries to her thumb, shoulder, and foot limited her to just 22 regular-season games.

==== Golden State Valkyries (2025–2026) ====
On December 6, 2024, Fagbenle was selected as the Golden State Valkyries' pick from the Indiana Fever's roster in the 2024 WNBA expansion draft.

==== Toronto Tempo (2026–present) ====
On April 14, 2026, she signed with the Toronto Tempo ahead of the 2026 WNBA season.

== International career ==
She has represented Great Britain since 2012 having represented the country at the under-16, 18 and 20 levels and competing at the 2011 FIBA Europe Under-20 Championship held in Serbia.

She was named in the British team for the women's basketball tournament at the 2012 Summer Olympics in London, having been fast-tracked into the senior side from the under-20s. She averaged 4.8 points, 4 rebounds, 1 assist, 1.2 blocks, and 1 steal in 19.2 minutes per game. GB went 0-5 and failed to qualify from their group.

Her selection for the Olympics came after a 12-month period in which she was unable to play for the Harvard Crimson women's basketball team due to the National Collegiate Athletic Association (NCAA) declaring her ineligible. Fagbenle had taken the General Certificate of Secondary Education (GCSE) exam whilst at school in the UK and NCAA rules say that an athlete must be enrolled in college within two years of sitting for the exam; Fagbenle took an additional year to graduate from high school because she repeated a year after moving to the United States.

Since her debut, Fagbenle has represented Great Britain at several major FIBA tournaments including the 2015, 2023 and 2025 Women's EuroBasket finals and the 2020 Olympic qualification tournament.

She was a key part of the GB team which reached the semi-finals of the 2019 EuroBasket, averaging a tournament-best 20.9 points and earning selection for the All-Star Five team of the tournament.

Since 2025, she has been Great Britain's captain.

== Personal life ==
Fagbenle was born on 8 September 1992 to a Nigerian family in Baltimore, Maryland, and has eleven siblings, including actor O-T Fagbenle, film producer Luti Fagbenle, and video producer Oladapo 'Daps' Fagbenle.

Her family moved to London, United Kingdom when she was aged 2 and she began playing basketball at the Haringey Angels club.

When she was 15, she returned to the United States to study at Blair Academy in New Jersey. She attended Harvard University before transferring to the University of Southern California for her final year of NCAA basketball. As of 2012 she was 1.93 metres (6 ft 4 in) tall and weighed 79.5 kilograms (175 lb).

An Ivy League graduate, Fagbenle has spent time as a model and has, amid basketball, followed her siblings into acting with a role in Children of Blood and Bone.

== WNBA statistics ==
Legend
GP	Games played	GS	Games started	MPG	Minutes per game	RPG	Rebounds per game
APG	Assists per game	SPG	Steals per game	BPG	Blocks per game	PPG	Points per game
TO	Turnovers per game	FG%	Field-goal percentage	3P%	3-point field-goal percentage	FT%	Free-throw percentage
**Bold**	Career best	°	League leader

†	Denotes seasons in which Fagbenle won a WNBA championship

=== WNBA ===
==== Regular season ====
WNBA regular season statistics
Year	Team	GP	GS	MPG	FG%	3P%	FT%	RPG	APG	SPG	BPG	TO	PPG
2016	Did not play (continuing education)												
2017^{†}	Minnesota	21	0	4.2	.500	—	.778	1.0	.0	.1	.2	**.4**	1.2
2018	Minnesota	30	2	9.4	.506	—	.696	2.0	.6	.3	.3	.7	3.1
2019	Minnesota	18	0	15.1	**.519**	.167	.722	2.9	.8	.3	.3	1.8	5.4
2020	Did not appear in WNBA												
2021	Did not appear in WNBA												
2022	Did not appear in WNBA												
2023	Did not appear in WNBA												
2024	Indiana	22	2	18.9	.509	.167	**.786**	4.7	.9	.5	**.7**	1.2	6.4
2025	Golden State	**39**	**38**	**23.7**	.502	.194	.733	**4.9**	**1.6**	**.9**	.6	1.5	**7.4**
2026	Toronto	25	10	17.8	.500	**.344**	.563	3.4	1.0	.5	.3	1.3	5.9
**Career**	6 years, 4 teams	155	52	15.7	.505	.232	.699	3.3	.9	.5	.4	1.2	5.1

==== Playoffs ====
Temi Fagbenle WNBA Playoff Statistics
Year	Team	GP	GS	MPG	FG%	3P%	FT%	RPG	APG	SPG	BPG	TO	PPG
2017^{†}	Minnesota	**2**	0	2.0	.667	.000	.000	.5	.0	.0	.0	**.0**	2.0
2018	Minnesota	1	0	**24.0**	**.875**	**1.000**	.000	4.0	1.0	**1.0**	.0	**.0**	**15.0**
2019	Minnesota	1	0	16.0	.500	.000	.000	1.0	.0	**1.0**	**2.0**	**.0**	4.0
2024	Indiana	**2**	**1**	**24.0**	.444	.500	.000	**5.5**	2.0	.5	.0	.5	4.5
2025	Golden State	1	**1**	20.0	.625	.000	**.500**	3.0	**3.0**	.0	.0	1.0	12.0
**Career**	5 years, 3 teams	7	2	16.0	.625	.500	.500	2.9	1.1	.4	.3	.3	6.3

=== College ===
Temi Fagbenle NCAA Statistics
Year	Team	GP	GS	MPG	FG%	3P%	FT%	RPG	APG	SPG	BPG	TO	PPG
2012–13	Harvard	29	28	25.0	**.578**	**.667**	.684	7.7	1.1	1.0	1.3	2.8	12.3
2013–14	Harvard	30	30	25.7	.539	.286	.705	9.3	1.7	.8	**1.4**	2.6	13.0
2014–15	Harvard	27	27	29.4	.490	.250	**.773**	**10.1**	**2.0**	1.2	1.0	3.0	**14.3**
2015–16	Southern California	**32**	**32**	**30.3**	.514	.250	.705	8.7	1.3	**1.8**	1.2	**2.1**	13.6
**Career**		118	117	27.6	.526	.393	.722	8.9	1.5	1.2	1.2	2.6	13.3
