= María Conde =

Spanish basketball player (born 1997)

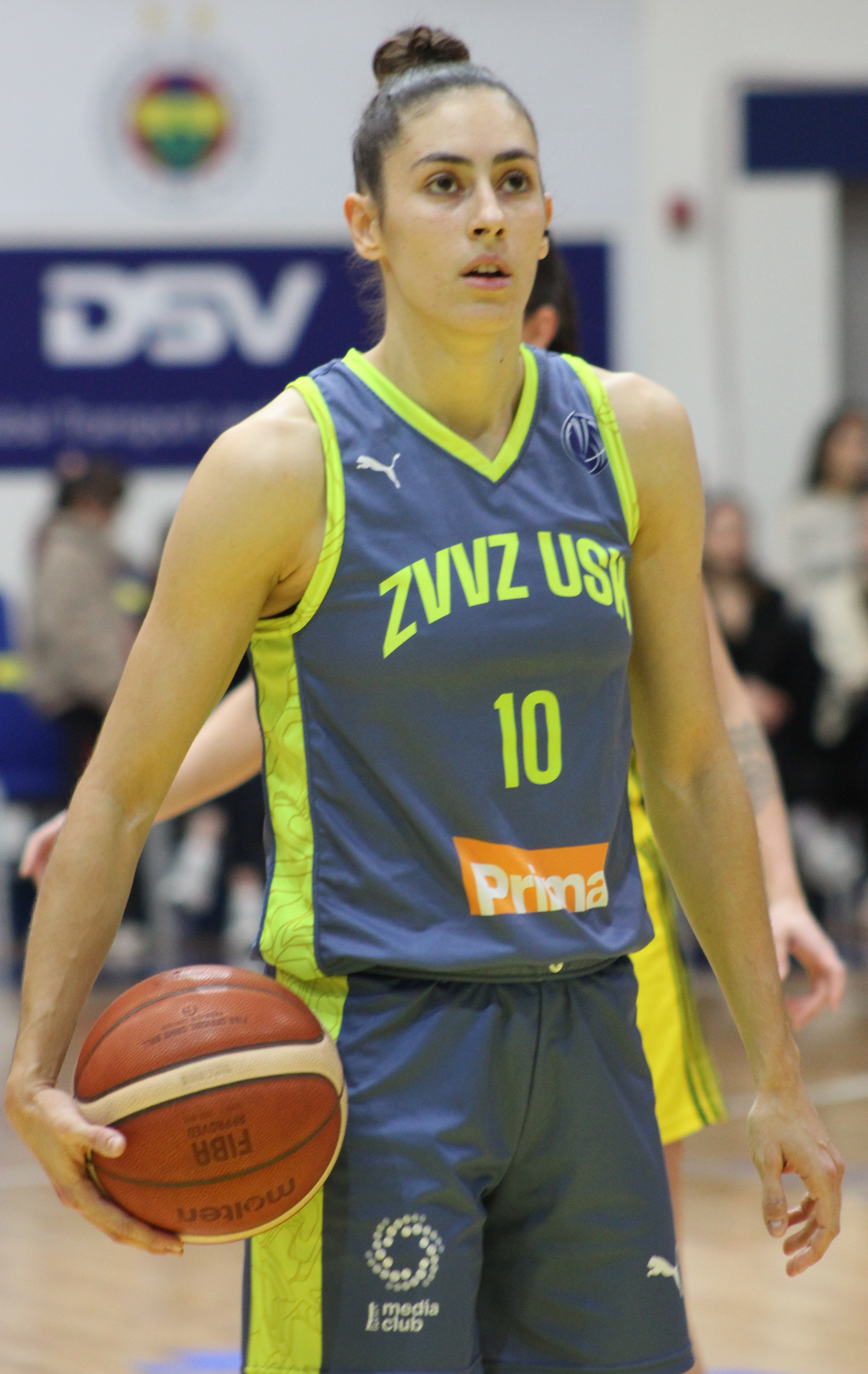
- Conde with ZVVZ USK Praha in 2024

No. 10 – Toronto Tempo
- Position: Small forward
- League: WNBA

Personal information
- Born: 14 January 1997 (age 29) Madrid, Spain
- Listed height: 6 ft 3 in (1.91 m)
- Listed weight: 168 lb (76 kg)

Career information
- College: Florida State (2015–2017)
- WNBA draft: 2019: 3rd round, 27th overall pick
- Drafted by: Chicago Sky

Career history
- 2014–2015: CB Estudiantes
- 2017–2018: Spar CityLift Girona
- 2018–2019: Wisła Can-Pack Kraków
- 2019–2020: CCC Polkowice
- 2020–2025: ZVVZ USK Praha
- 2025–present: Famila Basket Schio
- 2026–present: Toronto Tempo
- Stats at Basketball Reference

María Conde Alcolado (born 14 January 1997) is a Spanish professional basketball player for the Toronto Tempo of the Women's National Basketball Association (WNBA) and Famila Basket Schio of the Lega Basket Femminile. Conde also plays for Spain. She played two years of college basketball for the Florida State Seminoles. She was selected 27th overall by the Chicago Sky in the 2019 WNBA draft.

== Club career ==
She played in local club CB Estudiantes since the age of 10, soon developing into one of their best players and winning regional and state youth tournaments. In the 2014–15 season, still in junior years, Conde made her debut with the senior team in the Spanish second tier league, averaging 15.8 PPP and 6.7 RPP.

Her performances attracted the attention of several American colleges, and she opted for Florida State University after talking to fellow Spaniard Leticia Romero. Conde played at Florida State for two years, averaging 15.6 MPP and 3.3PPG in her sophomore year.

Conde returned to Spain in 2017 to play for Spar CityLift Girona in the Liga Femenina de Baloncesto and EuroCup.

She signed for Polish team Wisła Can-Pack Kraków for the 2018–19 season.

Conde played for USK Praha of the Czech Women's Basketball League from 2020 to 2025.

She signed with Famila Basket Schio of the Lega Basket Femminile for the 2025–26 season.

=== WNBA ===
Conde was selected in the third round of the 2019 WNBA draft by the Chicago Sky. However, she never joined the team.

On 6 December 2024, she was selected as the Golden State Valkyries' pick from the Chicago Sky's roster in the 2024 WNBA expansion draft.

On 3 April 2026, Conde was selected as the Toronto Tempo pick from the Golden State Valkyries' roster in the 2026 WNBA expansion draft. She signed her contract on 11 April.

=== EuroCup and EuroLeague stats ===
Season	Team	GP	MPP	PPP	RPP	APP
2017-18 EuroCup	(Spain) Spar CityLift Girona	12	12.6	2.4	2.6	1.0
2018-19 EuroCup	(Poland) Wisla Can-Pack	10	25.3	10.7	4.2	2.2
2019-20 EuroCup	(Poland) CCC Polkowice	9	31.8	17.2	7.4	2.2
2020-21 EuroLeague	(Czech Republic) USK Praha	3	21.9	9.7	4.7	2.7
2021-22 EuroLeague	(Czech Republic) USK Praha					

== National team ==
Conde started playing with Spain's youth teams at 16, winning a total of five medals from 2013 to 2017. She made her debut with the senior team in 2017, at 20, winning a gold medal in the 2017 Eurobasket. Up to 2021, she had 46 caps, with 4.5 PPP:

- 2013 FIBA Europe Under-16 Championship (youth)
- 2014 FIBA Under-17 World Championship (youth)
- 4th 2015 FIBA Under-19 World Championship (youth)
- 2015 FIBA Europe Under-18 Championship (youth)
- 2016 FIBA Europe Under-20 Championship (youth)
- 2017 FIBA Europe Under-20 Championship (youth)
- 2017 Eurobasket
- 7th 2021 Eurobasket
- 6th 2020 Summer Olympics
- 2023 Eurobasket

== Personal life ==
Conde's brother Diego is a professional footballer.

== Career statistics ==
Legend
GP	Games played	GS	Games started	MPG	Minutes per game	RPG	Rebounds per game
APG	Assists per game	SPG	Steals per game	BPG	Blocks per game	PPG	Points per game
TO	Turnovers per game	FG%	Field-goal percentage	3P%	3-point field-goal percentage	FT%	Free-throw percentage
**Bold**	Career best	°	League leader

=== WNBA ===
WNBA regular season statistics
Year	Team	GP	GS	MPG	FG%	3P%	FT%	RPG	APG	SPG	BPG	TO	PPG
2026	Toronto	35	20	26.4	.359	.340	.881	4.5	2.5	.5	.2	1.6	8.5
**Career**	1 year, 1 team	35	20	26.4	.359	.340	.881	4.5	2.5	.5	.2	1.6	8.5
