= 2026 ESPY Awards =

Athletic awards show

- Date: July 15, 2026
- Location: David H. Koch Theater, New York City
- Country: United States
- Hosted by: Marcello Hernández

Television/radio coverage
- Network: ABC
- Runtime: 180 minutes

The 2026 ESPY Awards, the 34th annual ceremony of the ESPY Awards, was held on July 15, 2026, at the David H. Koch Theater in New York City. It was broadcast by ABC.

== Ceremony information ==
Comedian Marcello Hernández hosted the ceremony at the David H. Koch Theater in New York City.

== Winners and nominees ==
The nominations were announced in June 2026, with the winners announced during the ceremony.

| Best Athlete, Men's Sports: Jalen Brunson – New York Knicks, NBA; Matthew Stafford – Los Angeles Rams, NFL; Shohei Ohtani – Los Angeles Dodgers, MLB; Lionel Messi – Inter Miami FC, MLS | Best Athlete, Women's Sports: A'ja Wilson – Las Vegas Aces, WNBA; Mikaela Shiffrin – Alpine Skiing; Hilary Knight – USA Hockey/Seattle Torrent, PWHL; Nelly Korda – Golf |
| Best Breakthrough Athlete: Alysa Liu – Figure Skating; Fernando Mendoza – Indiana Hoosiers football; Drake Maye – New England Patriots, NFL; Macklin Celebrini – San Jose Sharks, NHL | Best Comeback Athlete: Christian McCaffrey – San Francisco 49ers, NFL; Anthony Kim – Golf; Kyndal Stowers – Texas A&M volleyball; Savy King – Angel City FC, NWSL |
| Best College Athlete, Men's Sports: Fernando Mendoza – Indiana football; Cameron Boozer – Duke basketball; Mitchell Mesenbrink – Penn State wrestling; Donavan Phillip – NC State soccer | Best College Athlete, Women's Sports: Lauren Betts – UCLA basketball; Madison Taylor – Northwestern lacrosse; Faith Torrez – Oklahoma gymnastics; Olivia Babcock – Pittsburgh volleyball |
| Best Team: New York Knicks – NBA; Seattle Seahawks – NFL; Texas Longhorns – Women's College World Series; Indiana Hoosiers – NCAA Football; Las Vegas Aces – WNBA; Carolina Hurricanes – NHL; Los Angeles Dodgers – MLB; Team USA Women's Hockey – 2026 Winter Olympics; Team USA Men's Hockey – 2026 Winter Olympics | Best Championship Performance: Jalen Brunson – New York Knicks; Teagan Kavan – Texas Longhorns softball; Aerin Frankel – USA Women's Hockey; Connor Hellebuyck – USA Men's Hockey |
| Best Athlete with a Disability: Declan Farmer – Sledge hockey; Jake Adicoff – Paralympic Nordic skiing; Oksana Masters – Paralympic cross-country skiing; Susannah Scaroni – Wheelchair racing | Best Play: OG Anunoby – Tip-In to win game 4 of the NBA Finals; USA Women's Hockey – Golden Goal for Gold; USA Men's Hockey – Golden Goal for Gold; Braylon Mullins – Buzzer-beater 3 for UConn to beat Duke in NCAA Men's March Madness; Caleb Williams – Game Tying TD vs. Rams |
| Best Record-Breaking Performance: Myles Garrett, Cleveland Browns – broke the NFL single-season sack record; Megan Grant, UCLA Softball – broke the NCAA single-season softball home run record; Johannes Høsflot Klæbo, Cross-country skiing – first athlete to win six gold medals at Winter Olympics; Sabastian Sawe, Long-distance running – first to finish a marathon in under two hours | Best Single-Game Performance: Shohei Ohtani, Los Angeles Dodgers – pitched six scoreless innings, struck out ten batters and hit three home runs; Bam Adebayo, Miami Heat – scored 83 points for the Miami Heat in a 150–129 win against the Washington Wizards, recording the second-highest single-game total in NBA history; Hannah Hidalgo, Notre Dame basketball – broke the NCAA record for most steals (16) in a game; Tyce Armstrong, Baylor baseball – hit three grand slams in a single game, tying a record set 50 years earlier |
| Best NFL Player: Myles Garrett – Cleveland Browns; Drake Maye – New England Patriots; Jaxon Smith-Njigba – Seattle Seahawks; Matthew Stafford – Los Angeles Rams | Best NHL Player: Connor McDavid – Edmonton Oilers; Nikita Kucherov – Tampa Bay Lightning; Nathan MacKinnon – Colorado Avalanche; Macklin Celebrini – San Jose Sharks |
| Best NBA Player: Jalen Brunson – New York Knicks; Shai Gilgeous-Alexander – Oklahoma City Thunder; Nikola Jokić – Denver Nuggets; Victor Wembanyama – San Antonio Spurs | Best WNBA Player: A'ja Wilson – Las Vegas Aces; Napheesa Collier – Minnesota Lynx; Allisha Gray – Atlanta Dream; Alyssa Thomas – Phoenix Mercury |
| Best MLB Player: Shohei Ohtani – Los Angeles Dodgers; Aaron Judge – New York Yankees; Cal Raleigh – Seattle Mariners; Paul Skenes – Pittsburgh Pirates | Best Soccer Player: Lionel Messi – Inter Miami CF; Temwa Chawinga – KC Current; Ousmane Dembélé – PSG/France; Alexia Putellas – FC Barcelona/Spain |
| Best Golfer: Scottie Scheffler; Rory McIlroy; Nelly Korda; Jeeno Thitikul | Best Fighter: Terence Crawford – Boxing; Claressa Shields – Boxing; Gabriela Fundora – Boxing; Justin Gaethje – MMA |
| Best Driver: Lando Norris – Formula One; Álex Palou – IndyCar; Kimi Antonelli – Formula One; Tyler Reddick – NASCAR | Best Tennis Player: Carlos Alcaraz; Jannik Sinner; Aryna Sabalenka; Elena Rybakina |

== Honorary awards ==
Jimmy V Award

- Jim Abbott

Arthur Ashe Courage Award

- Jason Collins (Note: Jason Collins was posthumously honored with the award, which was accepted by Jarron Collins, his twin brother.)

Pat Tillman Award for Service

- Scott Ruskan

Muhammad Ali Sports Humanitarian Award

- Stephen Curry
  - Adam Thielen
  - Damar Hamlin

Sports Philanthropist of the Year Award

- Laurie Tisch

Sports Humanitarian Team of the Year

- Baltimore Ravens
  - Charlotte Hornets
  - Cleveland Browns
  - Seattle Storm

Billie Jean King Youth Leadership Award

- Julia Howe
- Kelis Armstrong
- Sam Phillips

Stuart Scott ENSPIRE Award

- Jeffrey Lurie

== Presenters and performers ==
The event featured musical performances by hip-hop artists De La Soul, Ghostface Killah, and Slick Rick, alongside a special appearance by the Savannah Bananas baseball team.

=== Presenters ===
- Simone Biles
- Allyson Felix
- Will Ferrell
- Eileen Gu
- Tiffany Haddish
- Kevin Hart
- DJ Khaled
- Chloe Kim
- Billie Jean King
- Alysa Liu
- Ilona Maher
- Pat McAfee
- Tracy Morgan
- Jake Paul
- Robin Roberts
- Jayson Tatum
- Mike Tyson
- Lindsey Vonn

== In Memoriam ==
No in memoriam segment was held during the ceremony. Recently deceased athletes such as Kyle Busch were not mentioned during the broadcast. Despite this, Jason Collins was posthumously awarded with the Arthur Ashe Courage Award.
