= FIBA Women's Olympics All-Star Five =

The FIBA Women's Summer Olympics All-Star Five is an award for the sport of basketball, that is given by FIBA, to the five best women's players of the Summer Olympic Games.

== FIBA All-Star Five by tournament ==
*	Inducted into the Naismith Memorial Basketball Hall of Fame
**	Inducted into the FIBA Hall of Fame
***	Inducted into both the Naismith and FIBA Halls of Fame
	Denotes player who is still active
Player (X)	Denotes the number of times the player has been selected
**Player** **(in bold text)**	Indicates the player who won the event's Most Valuable Player award

Year	Player	Position	National Team	Ref.
2020	Rui Machida	Guard	Japan	
2020	**Breanna Stewart**	Guard	United States	
2020	Emma Meesseman	Forward	Belgium	
2020	A'ja Wilson	Forward	United States	
2020	Sandrine Gruda	Center	France	
2024	Gabby Williams	Forward	France	
2024	Breanna Stewart (2)	Forward	United States	
2024	Alanna Smith	Forward	Australia	
2024	Emma Meesseman (2)	Forward	Belgium	
2024	**A'ja Wilson** (2)	Center	United States	

== FIBA All-Second Team by tournament ==
Year	Player	Position	National Team	Ref.
2024	Ezinne Kalu	Point guard	Nigeria	
2024	Julie Vanloo	Point guard	Belgium	
2024	Satou Sabally	Forward	Germany	
2024	Valériane Ayayi	Forward	France	
2024	Ezi Magbegor	Center	Australia	
