= List of WNBA franchise post-season droughts =

This is a list of Women's National Basketball Association (WNBA) franchise post-season appearance droughts. This list includes the all-time and the active consecutive non-playoffs. Aside from the WNBA Playoff appearance droughts, this list also includes appearances in the WNBA Finals and WNBA championships win streak.

== Active droughts ==
=== WNBA Playoffs appearance droughts ===
This is a list of teams that have active and current consecutive seasons without playoff appearances.

List updated through September 19, 2025.

| ^ | Longest drought in team history |
| ~ | Tied for longest drought in team history |

| Streak | Team | Last appearance in WNBA Playoffs | References |
|---|---|---|---|
| 6 | Los Angeles Sparks^ | 2020 Second Round | |
| 3 | Chicago Sky | 2023 First Round | |
| 2 | Connecticut Sun | 2024 Semifinals | |
| 1 | Seattle Storm | 2025 First Round | |
| 1 | Phoenix Mercury | 2025 Finals | |
2026 Playoff teams
| 0 | Minnesota Lynx | 2026 First Round | |
| 0 | Dallas Wings | 2026 First Round | |
| 0 | Washington Mystics | 2026 First Round | |
| 0 | Indiana Fever | 2026 First Round | |
| 0 | New York Liberty | 2026 Semifinals | |
| 0 | Las Vegas Aces | 2026 Semifinals | |
| 0 | Atlanta Dream | 2026 Finals | |
| 0 | Golden State Valkyries | 2026 Finals | |

=== WNBA Playoffs series win droughts ===
| ^ | Longest drought in team history |
| ♦ | Most consecutive series losses in team history |

List updated through the 2025 playoffs.

Current Playoff series loss streak
| Seasons since win | Team | Last series win in WNBA Playoffs | Losing streak | Series losses – teams | Ref |
|---|---|---|---|---|---|
| 7 | Los Angeles Sparks^ | 2019 Second Round | 2 | 2019 Connecticut; 2020 Connecticut | |
| 7 | Washington Mystics | 2019 Finals | 4 | 2020 Phoenix; 2022 Seattle; 2023 New York; 2026 Atlanta | |
| 4 | Chicago Sky | 2022 First Round | 2 | 2022 Connecticut; 2023 Las Vegas | |
| 4 | Seattle Storm | 2022 First Round | 3 | 2022 Las Vegas; 2024 Las Vegas; 2025 Las Vegas | |
| 3 | Dallas Wings | 2023 First Round | 2 | 2023 Las Vegas; 2026 Golden State | |
| 2 | Connecticut Sun | 2024 First Round | 1 | 2024 Minnesota | |
| 1 | Minnesota Lynx | 2025 First Round | 2 | 2025 Phoenix; 2026 New York | |
| 1 | Indiana Fever | 2025 First Round | 2 | 2025 Las Vegas; 2026 Las Vegas | |
| 1 | Phoenix Mercury | 2025 Semifinals | 1 | 2025 Las Vegas | |
| | 2026 Playoff Series | Winners | | | |
| 0 | New York Liberty | 2026 First Round | 1 | 2026 Atlanta | |
| 0 | Las Vegas Aces | 2026 First Round | 1 | 2026 Golden State | |
| 0 | Atlanta Dream | 2026 Semifinals | 1 | 2026 Golden State | |
| 0 | Golden State Valkyries | 2026 Finals | 0 | 3-series win streak | |

=== WNBA Finals appearance droughts ===
| Seasons | Team | Last appearance in WNBA Finals | Result | Reference |
|---|---|---|---|---|
| 18 | Dallas Wings^{[a]} | 2008 | Won vs. San Antonio | |
| 11 | Indiana Fever | 2015 | Lost vs. Minnesota | |
| 9 | Los Angeles Sparks | 2017 | Lost vs. Minnesota | |
| 7 | Washington Mystics | 2019 | Won vs. Connecticut | |
| 6 | Seattle Storm | 2020 | Won vs. Las Vegas | |
| 4 | Chicago Sky | 2021 | Won vs. Phoenix | |
| 4 | Connecticut Sun | 2022 | Lost vs. Las Vegas | |
| 2 | Minnesota Lynx | 2024 | Lost vs. New York | |
| 2 | New York Liberty | 2024 | Won vs. Minnesota | |
| 1 | Las Vegas Aces | 2025 | Won vs. Phoenix | |
| 1 | Phoenix Mercury | 2025 | Lost vs. Las Vegas | |
| | 2026 Finalists | | | |
| 0 | Atlanta Dream | 2026 | Lost vs. Golden State | |
| 0 | Golden State Valkyries | 2026 | Won vs. Atlanta | |

- ^{a} The Dallas Wings last appeared in the 2008 WNBA Finals as the Detroit Shock.

=== WNBA championship title droughts ===
| Seasons | Team | Last WNBA championship | Reference |
|---|---|---|---|
| 27 | Connecticut Sun | Never | |
| 18 | Atlanta Dream | Never | |
| 18 | Dallas Wings^{[a]} | 2008 | |
| 14 | Indiana Fever | 2012 | |
| 12 | Phoenix Mercury | 2014 | |
| 10 | Los Angeles Sparks | 2016 | |
| 9 | Minnesota Lynx | 2017 | |
| 7 | Washington Mystics | 2019 | |
| 6 | Seattle Storm | 2020 | |
| 5 | Chicago Sky | 2021 | |
| 2 | New York Liberty | 2024 | |
| 1 | Las Vegas Aces | 2025 | |
| 0 | Golden State Valkyries | 2026 | |

- ^{a} The Dallas Wings last won a championship in the 2008 WNBA Finals as the Detroit Shock.

== All-time droughts ==
=== Longest post-season droughts in team history ===
Updated through the 2026 season.

| ^ | Denotes active drought |

| Team | Longest streak with no post-season appearances | Seasons |
|---|---|---|
| Chicago Sky | 2006 through 2012 | 7 |
| Indiana Fever | 2017 through 2023 | 7 |
| Phoenix Mercury | 2001 through 2006 | 6 |
| Minnesota Lynx | 2005 through 2010 | 6 |
| Los Angeles Sparks ^ | 2021 through 2026 | 6 |
| Dallas Wings | 2010 through 2014 | 5 |
| Las Vegas Aces | 1997 through 2000; 2003 through 2006; 2015 through 2018 | 4 |
| Connecticut Sun | 2013 through 2016 | 4 |
| Atlanta Dream | 2019 through 2022 | 4 |
| New York Liberty | 2018 through 2020 | 3 |
| Washington Mystics | 1998 through 1999; 2007 through 2008; 2011 through 2012; 2024 through 2025 | 2 |
| Seattle Storm | 2000 through 2001; 2014 through 2015 | 2 |

=== Longest post-season series win droughts in team history ===
Updated through the 2026 season.

| ^ | Denotes active drought |

| Team | Longest streak with no post-season series wins | Seasons |
|---|---|---|
| Washington Mystics | 2003 through 2016 | 14 |
| Dallas Wings | 2010 through 2022 | 13 |
| Minnesota Lynx | 1999 through 2010 | 12 |
| Las Vegas Aces | 2009 through 2018 | 10 |
| Atlanta Dream | 2017 through 2025 | 9 |
| Indiana Fever | 2016 through 2024 | 9 |
| Chicago Sky | 2006 through 2013 | 8 |
| Phoenix Mercury | 1999 through 2006 | 8 |
| New York Liberty | 2016 through 2022 | 7 |
| Seattle Storm | 2011 through 2017 | 7 |
| Los Angeles Sparks ^ | 2020 through 2026 | 7 |
| Connecticut Sun | 2013 through 2018 | 6 |
| Golden State Valkyries | 2025 through 2025 | 1 |

== See also ==
- List of WNBA franchise post-season streaks
- List of NBA franchise postseason droughts
