= A'ja Wilson =

American basketball player (born 1996)

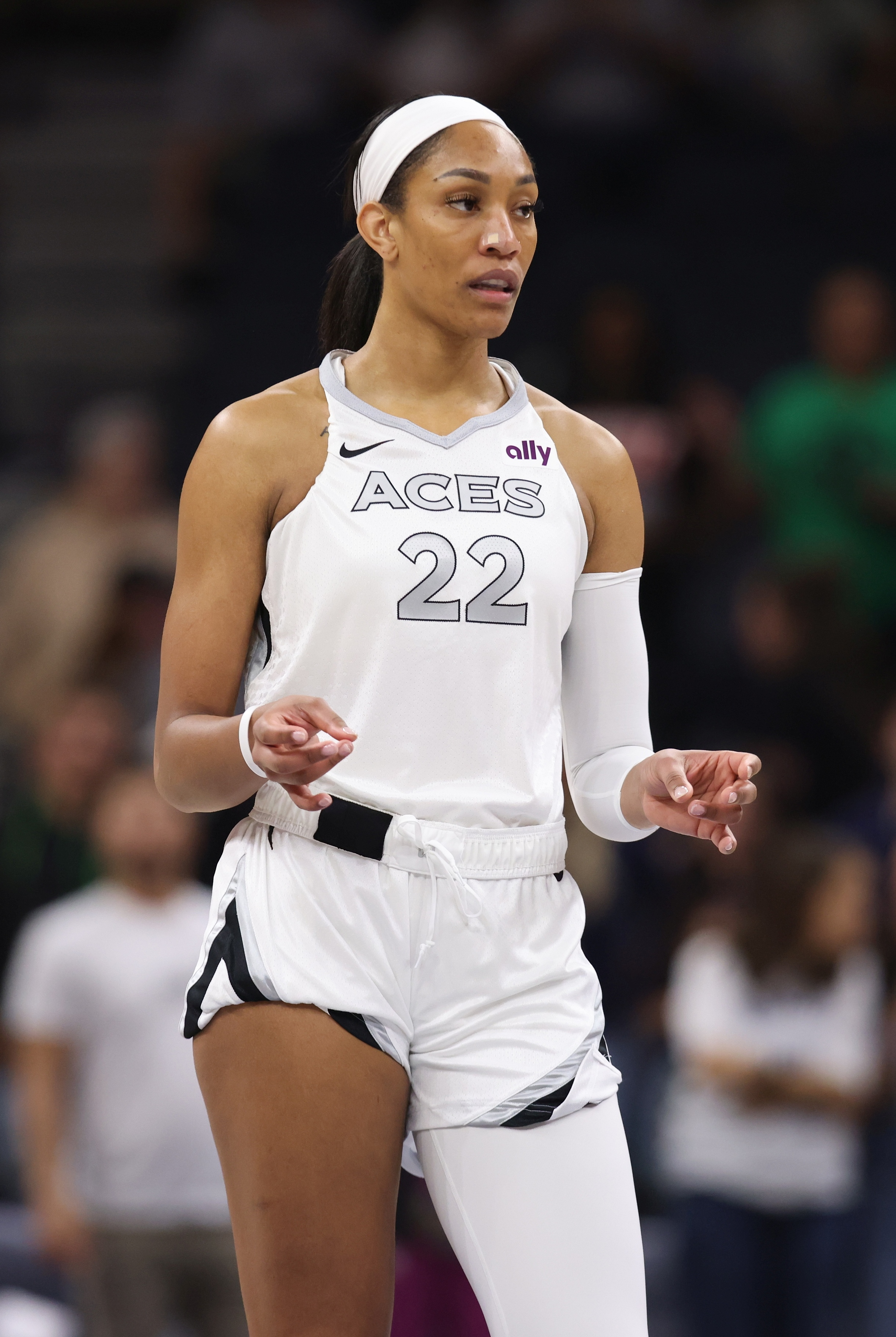
- Wilson with the Las Vegas Aces in 2024

No. 22 – Las Vegas Aces
- Position: Center
- League: WNBA

Personal information
- Born: August 8, 1996 (age 30) Columbia, South Carolina, U.S.
- Listed height: 6 ft 4 in (1.93 m)
- Listed weight: 195 lb (88 kg)

Career information
- High school: Heathwood Hall Episcopal (Columbia, South Carolina)
- College: South Carolina (2014–2018)
- WNBA draft: 2018: 1st round, 1st overall pick
- Drafted by: Las Vegas Aces
- Playing career: 2018–present

Career history
- 2018–present: Las Vegas Aces
- 2018–2019: Shaanxi Red Wolves

Career highlights
- 3× WNBA champion (2022, 2023, 2025); 2× WNBA Finals MVP (2023, 2025); 5× WNBA MVP (2020, 2022, 2024–2026); 3× WNBA Defensive Player of the Year (2022, 2023, 2025); 8× WNBA All-Star (2018, 2019, 2021–2026); 6× All-WNBA First Team (2020, 2022–2026); All-WNBA Second Team (2021); 5× WNBA All-Defensive First Team (2022–2026); WNBA All-Defensive Second Team (2020); 3× WNBA Peak Performer (2024– 2026); 3× WNBA scoring champion (2024– 2026); 6× WNBA blocks leader (2020, 2022–2026); Commissioner's Cup champion (2022); WNBA All-Rookie Team (2018); WNBA Rookie of the Year (2018); AP Female Athlete of the Year (2025); 3× Best WNBA Player ESPY Award (2023, 2024, 2026); 2× Best Female Athlete ESPY Award (2024, 2026); NCAA champion (2017); NCAA tournament Most Outstanding Player (2017); AP Player of the Year (2018); Honda Sports Award (2018); Naismith College Player of the Year (2018); John R. Wooden Award (2018); Wade Trophy (2018); USBWA National Player of the Year (2018); Lisa Leslie Award (2018); 3× All-American – USBWA, WBCA Coaches' (2016–2018); 3× First-team All-American – AP (2016–2018); Third-team All-American – AP (2015); SEC Female Athlete of the Year (2018); 3× SEC Player of the Year (2016–2018); 2× SEC Defensive Player of the Year (2016, 2018); 2× SEC Tournament MVP (2017, 2018); 4× First-team All-SEC (2015–2018); 3× SEC All-Defensive Team (2016–2018); SEC All-Freshman Team (2015); SEC Freshman of the Year (2015); No. 22 retired by South Carolina Gamecocks; Naismith Prep Player of the Year (2014); MaxPreps National Player of the Year (2014); McDonald's All-American (2014); South Carolina Miss Basketball (2014); 3× USA Basketball Female Athlete of the Year (2015, 2022, 2024); FIBA Women's Olympics MVP (2024); FIBA Women's World Cup MVP (2022); FIBA Under-19 World Cup MVP (2015); FIBA Under-18 Americas Championship MVP (2014)
- Stats at WNBA.com
- Stats at Basketball Reference
Medals
Women's basketball
Representing the United States
Olympic Games
Gold medal – first place	2020 Tokyo	Team
Gold medal – first place	2024 Paris	Team
World Cup
Gold medal – first place	2018 Spain
Gold medal – first place	2022 Australia
FIBA Under-19 World Cup
Gold medal – first place	2013 Lithuania	Team
Gold medal – first place	2015 Russia	Team
FIBA Under-18 Americas Championship
Gold medal – first place	2014 United States	Team

A'ja Riyadh Wilson (/ˈeɪʒə/ AY-zhə; born August 8, 1996) is an American professional basketball player for the Las Vegas Aces of the Women's National Basketball Association (WNBA). A five-time league MVP, Wilson is widely regarded as one of the greatest women's basketball players of all time.

Wilson played college basketball at the University of South Carolina and helped lead the Gamecocks to their first NCAA women's basketball championship in 2017, winning the NCAA basketball tournament Most Outstanding Player award. In 2018, she won a record third straight SEC Player of the Year award, leading South Carolina to a record fourth straight SEC tournament championship, becoming the all-time leading scorer in South Carolina women's basketball history, and was a consensus first-team All-American for the third consecutive season. Wilson swept all National Player of the Year awards (Wade, AP, Honda, USBWA, Wooden and Naismith) as the best player in women's college basketball.

In the 2018 WNBA draft, Wilson was drafted first overall by the Las Vegas Aces. She won her first WNBA MVP with the Aces in 2020, winning again in 2022, 2024, 2025, and 2026, making her the first WNBA player to win three straight MVP awards. In 2022, Wilson helped lead the Aces to their first title in franchise history, a feat she repeated in 2023 while earning Finals MVP. On July 7, 2024, in a matchup against the Dallas Wings, she became the Aces' all-time leading scorer. In 2025, she led the Aces to a third championship title, becoming the first WNBA or NBA player to win a scoring title, be a champion, Finals MVP, MVP and Defensive Player of the Year in the same season.

Internationally, Wilson plays for the United States women's national basketball team, with whom she has won two Olympic and two World Cup gold medals.

== Early life ==
Wilson was born on August 8, 1996, to Roscoe Jr. and Eva Wilson. She said on NPR's Wait Wait... Don't Tell Me! that she was named for her father's favorite song, "Aja" by Steely Dan. Her middle name Riyadh came from the Saudi capital, where her maternal aunt was deployed in Operation Desert Storm.

Wilson spent her grade school and high school years as one of the few black students in Heathwood Hall Episcopal School, a private school in southern Columbia, South Carolina.

Wilson played a total of 119 high school games after making the varsity team as an eighth-grader. She averaged 24.7 points, 13.9 rebounds and 4.3 blocks a game throughout her high school career. She wore number 22 and played as a forward. After finishing as a runner-up in her junior year, Wilson led Heathwood Hall to the 2014 state championship as a senior. Her 35 points, 15 rebounds and five blocks per game as a senior made her the National High School Player of The Year in 2014, a Parade and McDonald's All-American, and the #1 rated ESPN HoopGurlz prospect in 2014. Wilson committed to play for Dawn Staley at the University of South Carolina.

== College career ==
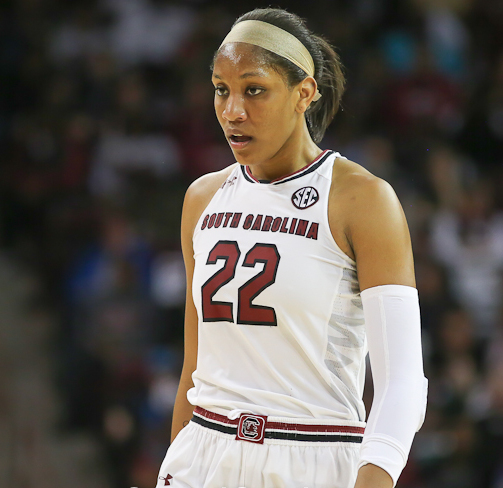
Wilson at South Carolina

Wilson played in 37 games her freshman year, leading to four single-game freshman records in the SEC and three single-season freshman records in the SEC, and won the SEC Freshman of the year award. In 2016 as a sophomore, Wilson won her first SEC Player of the Year award and was a consensus All-American, Wilson led the Gamecocks to a SEC regular-season and tournament championship. In 2017, Wilson once again led the Gamecocks to a SEC regular-season and tournament championship, and went on to win the school's first national championship with a stirring victory over the Mississippi State Bulldogs in the championship game. She was named the Most Outstanding Player of the tournament. In 2018, Wilson had her best season statistically, and won all of the National player of the year awards. She won a record third straight SEC Player of the Year award, and was also a Consensus All-American for the third straight year. Wilson finished her college career at South Carolina as the all-time leading scorer for the school.

== Professional career ==
=== WNBA ===
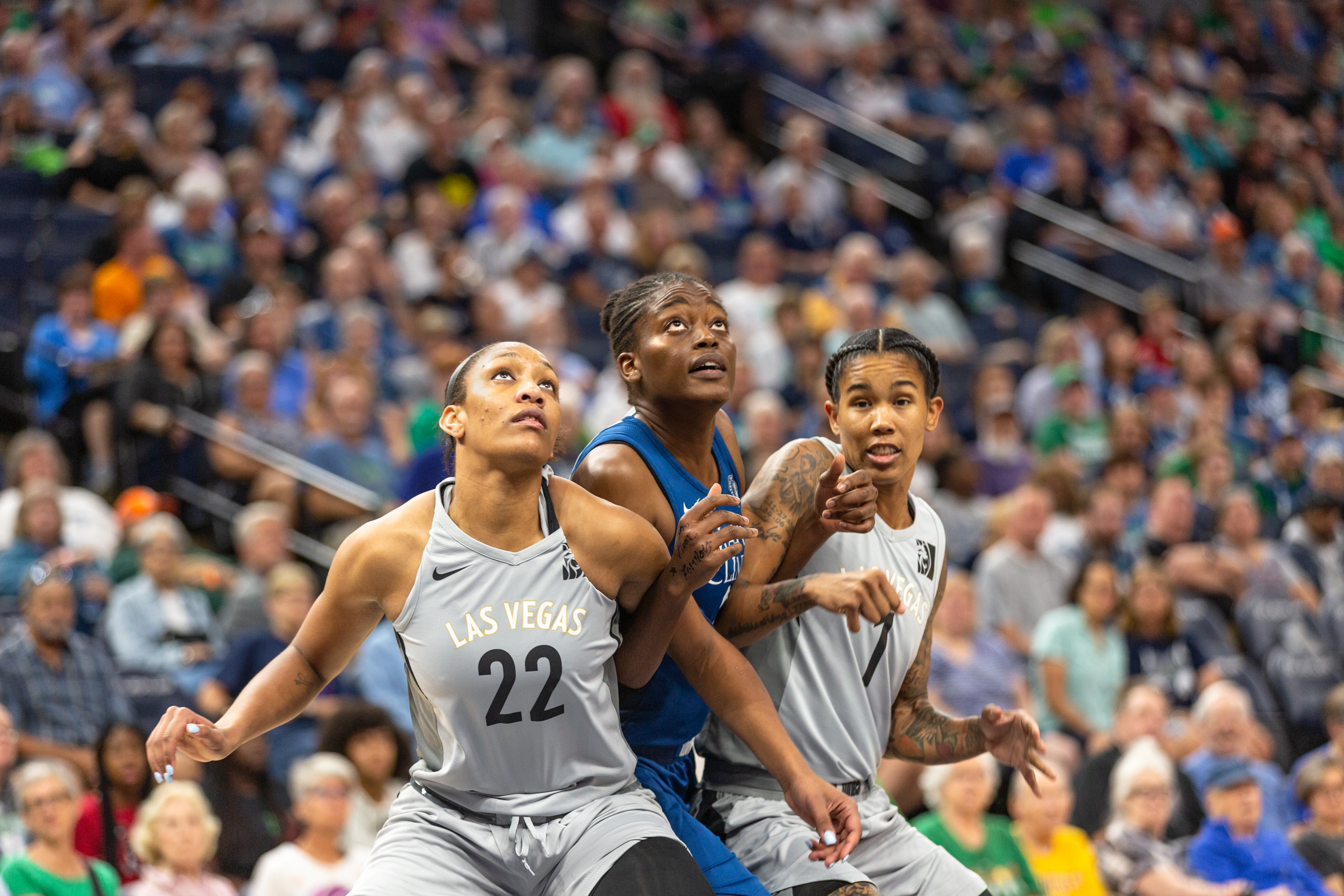
A'ja Wilson goes for a rebound in 2018.

In 2018, Wilson was drafted first overall by the Las Vegas Aces. On May 21, 2018, in her career debut, Wilson scored 14 points along with 10 rebounds in a 101–65 loss to the Connecticut Sun. On June 16, 2018, Wilson scored a career high of 35 points along with 13 rebounds in a 101–92 overtime victory against the Indiana Fever, becoming the second rookie in league history to score 35 points and record 10 rebounds. Wilson was voted into the 2018 WNBA All-Star Game. Later in the season, Wilson was named the WNBA Rookie of the Year. She was tied for third in scoring. Her season performance almost led the Aces to the playoffs as they finished ninth place with a 14–20 record.

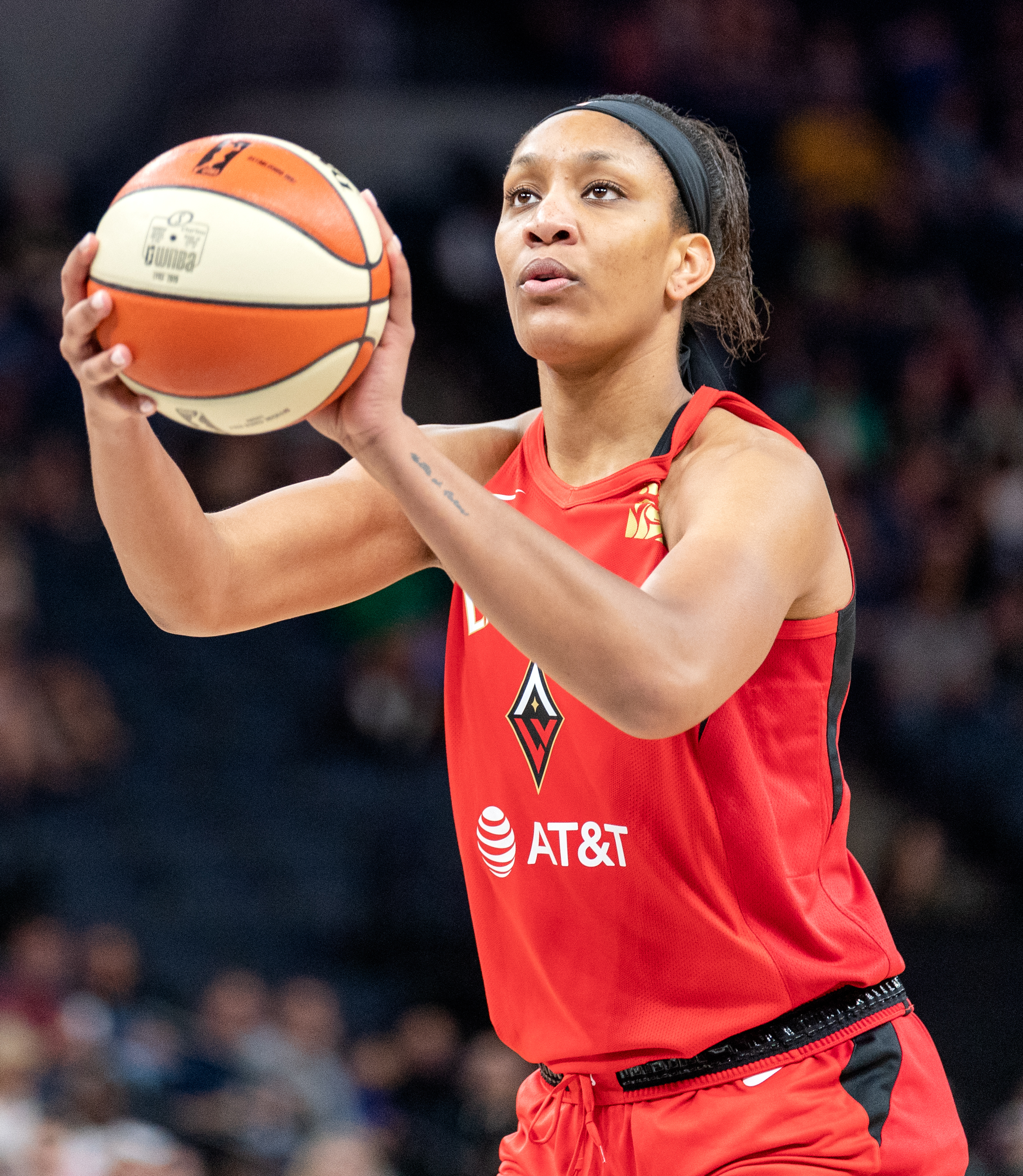
Wilson shooting a free throw in 2019

On June 29, 2019, Wilson scored a new career-high 39 points in a 102–97 overtime victory against the Indiana Fever. In July, Wilson suffered an ankle injury that kept her out for four weeks, causing her to miss the 2019 WNBA All-Star Game. She made her return in mid-August. By the end of the season, the Aces finished with a 21–13 record and the number 4 seed, receiving a bye to the second round, helping the franchise get back to the playoffs for the first time since 2014. In the second-round elimination game, the Aces beat the Chicago Sky 93–92; teammate Dearica Hamby came up with a steal and made the game-winning three-point shot from half-court with four seconds left. However, in the semi-finals, the Aces lost in four games to the Washington Mystics, who went on to win the 2019 WNBA championship.

In the 2020 season, the Aces were championship contenders. The season was delayed and shortened to 22 games in a bubble at IMG Academy due to the COVID-19 pandemic. All-star teammate Liz Cambage sat out the season due to health concerns, but Wilson led the team to a 18–4 record and the number 1 seed, receiving a double bye to the semifinals. In the semifinals, the Aces would defeat the Connecticut Sun in a five-game series, advancing to the Finals for the second time in franchise history (first since relocating to Las Vegas); however, the Aces were defeated by the Seattle Storm in a three-game sweep. Wilson won the MVP award for the 2020 season.

In 2022, Wilson would win her second MVP and first Defensive Player of the Year award, averaging 19.5 points, 9.4 rebounds and 1.9 blocks while leading the league with 17 double-doubles. Wilson helped propel the Aces to their second finals appearance in three seasons, where they defeated the Connecticut Sun in four games, giving Wilson her first championship.

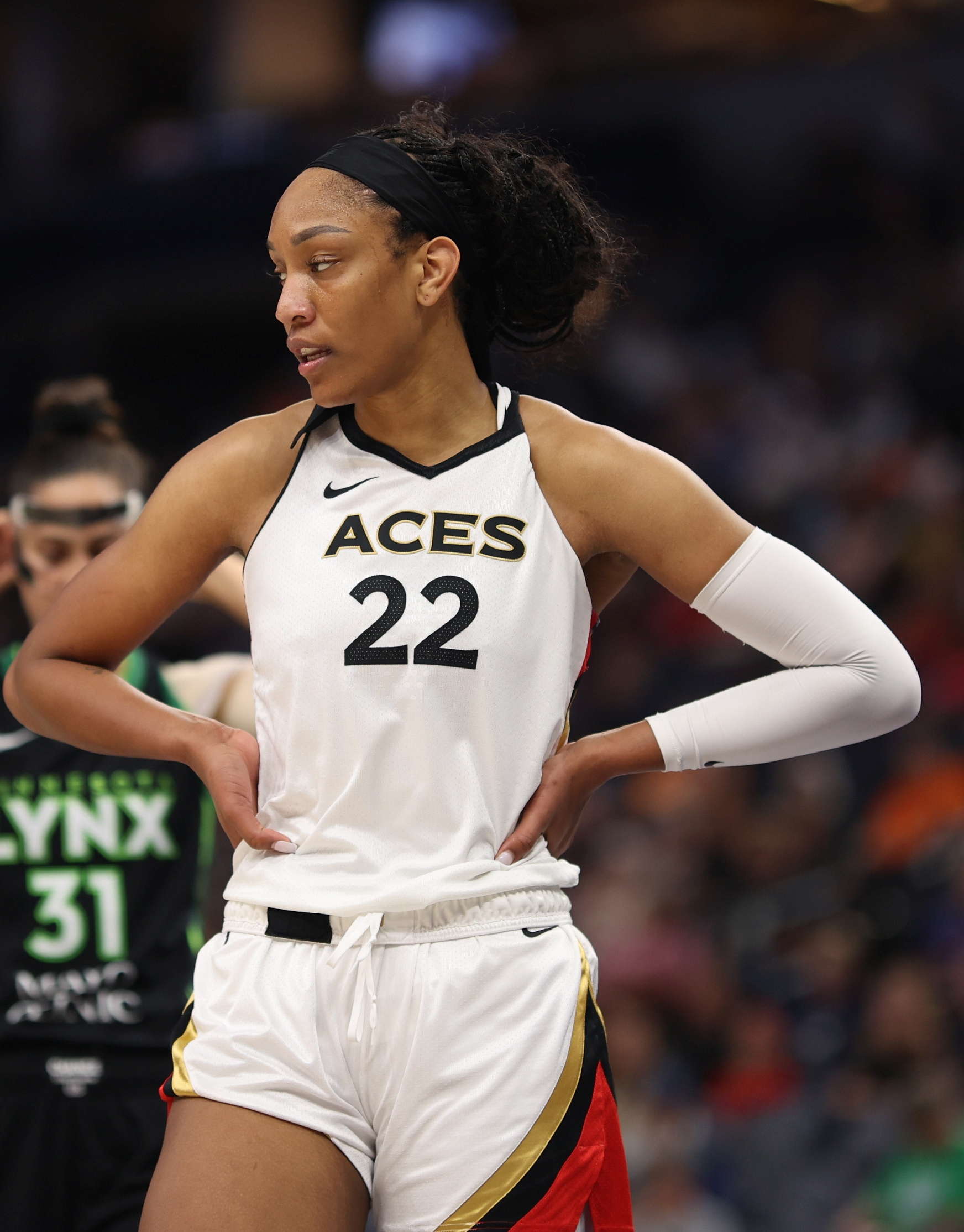
Wilson in 2023

On June 30, 2023, Wilson signed a contract extension with the Aces to stay in Las Vegas.

On August 22, 2023, Wilson achieved a new career high in points, scoring 53 points along with seven rebounds in a 112–100 victory over the Atlanta Dream. Her 53-point showing tied the WNBA's single-game record and was one of three 50-plus-point performances in WNBA history at the time.

Wilson was named first-team All-WNBA in 2023. She additionally repeated as Defensive Player of the Year.

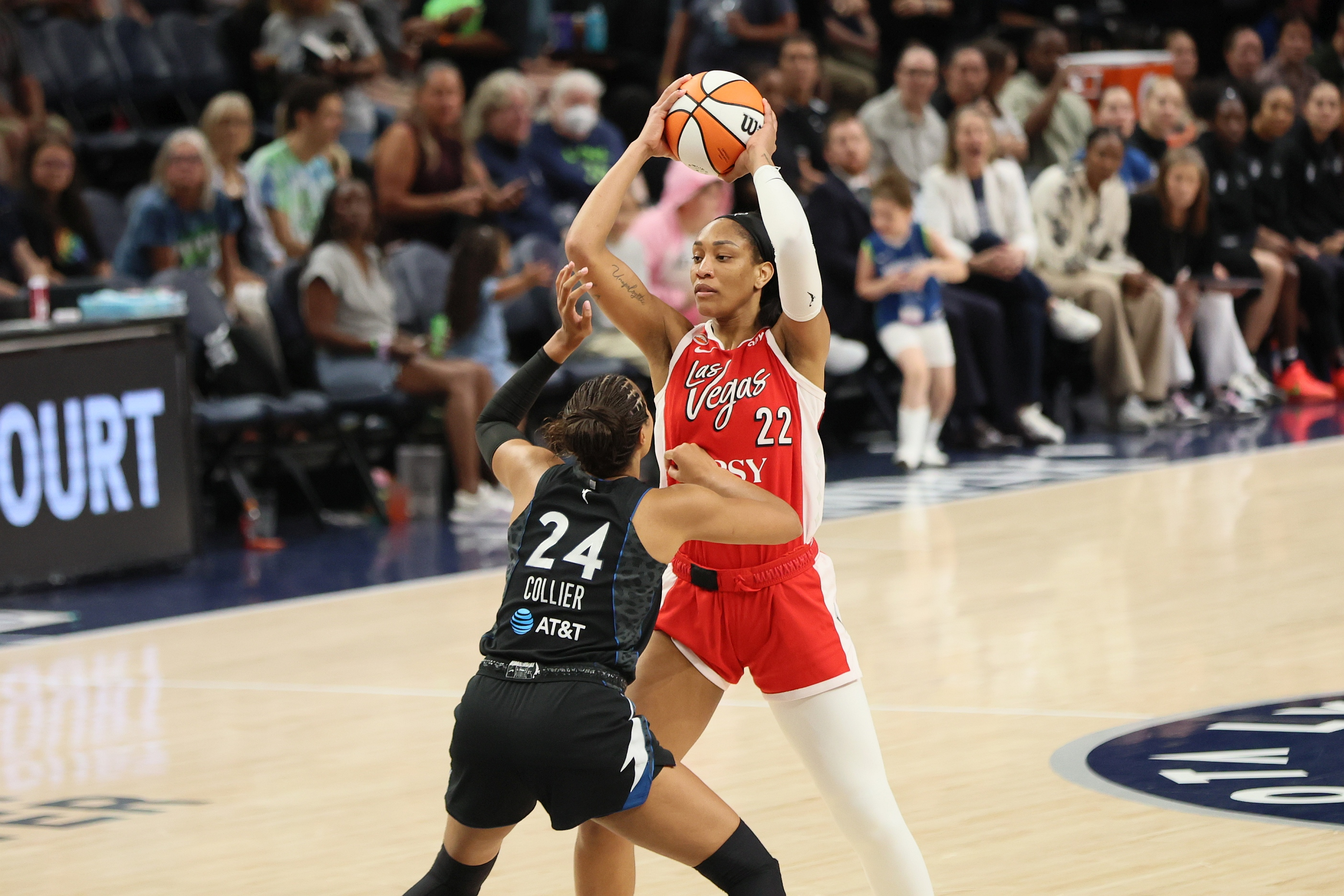
Wilson during a game against the Minnesota Lynx in August 2026.

The Aces swept their first two 2023 playoff series against the Chicago Sky and Dallas Wings, respectively. In the Finals against the New York Liberty, the Aces won the first two games of the series at home, while extending their playoff winning streak to eight games. Despite a game 3 setback on the Liberty's home floor and losing two starters to injury, Wilson and the Aces overcame a late double-digit game 4 deficit to defeat the Liberty 70–69 and win their second consecutive WNBA title, the first back-to-back WNBA championship since the Los Angeles Sparks repeated as champs in 2001 and 2002. Wilson posted averages of 23.8 points and 11.8 rebounds per game in the 2023 WNBA Finals, which bested her 2023 regular-season numbers of 22.8 points and 9.5 rebounds per game. She was awarded her first Finals MVP for her performance in the Aces–Liberty series.

On June 5, 2024, in the match-up against the Dallas Wings, Wilson became the first player to have at least 35-plus points, 10-plus rebounds and five-plus steals in a single game in WNBA history. On September 11, Wilson set the single-season scoring record against the Indiana Fever.

On August 10, 2025, in a 94–86 win over the Connecticut Sun, Wilson became the first player in WNBA history to record 30-plus points and 20 rebounds in the same game. On August 23, 2025, with 36 points in a win over the Washington Mystics, she became the first player in WNBA history to record multiple seasons in which she scored 30 or more points at least 10 times.

Wilson was named 2025 WNBA Defensive Player of the Year for the third time in her career, sharing the award with Alanna Smith.

On September 21, 2025, Wilson was announced as league MVP, becoming the first player in WNBA history to earn the award four times.

On October 10, 2025, Wilson and the Las Vegas Aces won the WNBA championship, beating the Phoenix Mercury 4–0 in the series, winning her third championship in four years and second WNBA Finals MVP award. She is the only player in the WNBA or NBA to ever win the scoring title, MVP, Defensive Player of the Year and Finals MVP in the same season.

In December 2025, Wilson was named by the Associated Press as its female Athlete of the Year, and was also named Time's Athlete of the Year.

The New York Times (The Athletic) named Wilson as one of the 20 most admired leaders in sports from 2025, describing Wilson as "one of the most dominant players in WNBA history, known for her strength, high basketball I.Q. and ability to control games on both ends of the floor". Jordan Chiles praised Wilson's confidence, heart, consistency and dedication.

On April 15, 2026, Wilson returned to the Aces on a three-year, $5 million supermax contract.

On October 8, 2026, Wilson was announced as league MVP, becoming the first player in WNBA history to earn the award five times, as well as becoming the first player in WNBA history to earn the award in three consecutive seasons.

=== Overseas ===
In August 2018, Wilson signed with the Shaanxi Red Wolves of the Women's Chinese Basketball Association for the 2018–19 off-season.

== National team career ==
=== 2020 Summer Olympics ===
In late March 2020, the International Olympic Committee (IOC) and the Tokyo Metropolitan Government postponed the 2020 Summer Olympics until the summer of 2021 due to the COVID-19 pandemic. On June 21, 2021, Wilson was named to the 12-player roster for Team USA for the 2020 Summer Olympics. She and Team USA went on to win the gold medal in the tournament, defeating Japan 90–75 in the final. At the conclusion of the tournament, Wilson was named to FIBA's All-Star Five team.

=== 2024 Summer Olympics ===
In June 2024, Wilson was again named to the U.S. women's Olympic team to compete at the 2024 Summer Olympics in France, alongside fellow Aces teammates, Chelsea Gray, Kelsey Plum and Jackie Young. Wilson led the United States with a double-double of 21 points and 13 rebounds to defeat France 67–66 in the final, earning Wilson her second consecutive gold medal and the United States' eighth consecutive gold medal. Wilson was named the MVP of the tournament after leading Team USA in points, rebounds, steals, blocks, field goals made, free throws made and efficiency. She was also named to FIBA's All-Star Five team.

== Career statistics ==
Legend
GP	Games played	GS	Games started	MPG	Minutes per game	FG%	Field goal percentage
3P%	3-point field goal percentage	FT%	Free throw percentage	RPG	Rebounds per game	APG	Assists per game
SPG	Steals per game	BPG	Blocks per game	TO	Turnovers per game	PPG	Points per game
**Bold**	Career high		Led Division I	°	Led the league	‡	WNBA record

†	Denotes season(s) in which Wilson won a WNBA championship
*	Denotes season(s) in which Wilson won an NCAA championship

=== WNBA ===
==== Regular season ====
WNBA regular season statistics
Year	Team	GP	GS	MPG	FG%	3P%	FT%	RPG	APG	SPG	BPG	TO	PPG
2018	Las Vegas	33	33	30.6	.462	—	.774	8.0	2.2	.8	1.6	1.4	20.7
2019	Las Vegas	26	25	28.4	.479	.000	.792	6.4	1.8	.5	1.7	2.1	16.5
2020	Las Vegas	22	22	31.7	.480	—	.781	8.5	2.0	1.2	2.0°	1.6	20.5
2021	Las Vegas	32	32	31.9	.444	**1.000**	**.876**	9.3	**3.1**	.9	1.3	1.4	18.3
2022^{†}	Las Vegas	36	36	30.0	.501	.373	.813	9.4	2.1	1.4	1.9°	1.7	19.5
2023^{†}	Las Vegas	40	40	30.7	**.557**	.310	.812	9.5	1.6	1.4	2.2°	1.6	22.8
2024	Las Vegas	38	38	**34.4**	.518	.317	.844	**11.9**	2.3	**1.8**	**2.6**°	**1.3**	**26.9**‡
2025^{†}	Las Vegas	40	40	31.2	.505	.424	.855	10.2	3.1	1.6	2.3°	2.2	23.4°
2026	Las Vegas	**41**	**41**	32.0	.527	.404	.864	9.4	3.2	1.4	1.9°	2.4	26.2°
**Career**	9 years, 1 team	308	307	31.3	.502	.376	.828	9.3	2.4	1.3	2.0	1.8	22.1
**Career**	All-Star	7	6	19.0	.513	21.1	1.000	4.4	2.0	1.0	.4	1.1	13.4

==== Playoffs ====
WNBA playoff statistics
Year	Team	GP	GS	MPG	FG%	3P%	FT%	RPG	APG	SPG	BPG	TO	PPG
2019	Las Vegas	5	5	33.7	.436	—	**.950**	7.8	1.6	.6	2.0°	1.6	13.4
2020	Las Vegas	8	8	35.4	.473	—	.857	8.9	2.4	1.0	2.3	2.0	20.8
2021	Las Vegas	5	5	32.2	.435	—	.654	9.2	3.2	1.0	1.0	2.2	14.2
2022^{†}	Las Vegas	10	10	**37.2**	.552	.143	.791	10.4	2.0	1.0	2.4	**1.3**	20.3
2023^{†}	Las Vegas	9	9	33.2	**.554**°	**.500**	.831	**11.8**	1.2	1.4	2.3	2.1	23.8
2024	Las Vegas	6	6	36.5	.535	**.500**	.750	9.7	2.4	.3	**2.5**°	**1.3**	21.3
2025^{†}	Las Vegas	**12**	**12**	36.0	.478	.400	.784	10.0	**3.3**	**2.1**	**2.5**	2.3	26.8
2026	Las Vegas	6	6	36.7	.519	.385	.825	9.3	1.3	1.3	1.5	1.8	**27.5**
**Career**	8 years, 1 team	61	61	35.3	.504	.346	.805	9.8	2.3	1.2	2.2	1.9	21.9

=== College ===
NCAA statistics
Year	Team	GP	GS	MPG	FG%	3P%	FT%	RPG	APG	SPG	BPG	TO	PPG
2014–15	South Carolina	**37**	1	19.8	.538	.333	.662	6.6	1.0	.9	1.8	**1.7**	13.1
2015–16	South Carolina	33	32	27.1	.531	—	.723	8.7	1.4	.8	3.1	2.2	16.1
2016–17*	South Carolina	35	**35**	28.4	**.588**	—	**.737**	7.8	1.4	**1.2**	2.6	1.9	17.9
2017–18	South Carolina	33	29	**29.4**	.542	**.417**	.732	**11.8**	**1.7**	1.0	**3.2**	2.5	**22.6**
**Career**		138	97	26.0	.550	.375	.715	8.7	1.4	1.0	2.6	2.1	17.3

== Off the court ==
=== Personal life ===
Wilson's mother, Eva Rakes Wilson, worked as a court stenographer for the Richland County School District 1 in Columbia, South Carolina. Wilson's father, Roscoe Wilson Jr., played college basketball at Benedict College and professionally in Europe for 10 seasons. Wilson has an older brother, Renaldo, who also played professional basketball overseas. Wilson is a Christian and grew up with strong ties to the religion (one of her grandfathers was a minister).

Wilson majored in mass communications at the University of South Carolina, graduating in May 2018. Wilson established the A'ja Wilson Foundation in 2019 that advocates for preventing bullying and education around dyslexia. She is also a member of the WNBA Social Justice Council.

Wilson is a member of Alpha Kappa Alpha sorority. She has multiple tattoos, including one for her late grandmother. As of February 2025, Wilson was in a relationship with Miami Heat center Bam Adebayo.

=== Business interests ===
Wilson is represented by Klutch Sports Group.

Wilson signed with Nike in May 2018. Six years later in May 2024, Wilson and Nike announced that she would be the 13th player in WNBA history to design and release a signature sneaker, the A'One.

In October 2018, Wilson signed an endorsement deal with Mountain Dew, the first female basketball player sign with the brand. During the 2020 Wubble season, Wilson continued her partnership with Mountain Dew and helped create the "Crossover Salon" to provide haircuts for players and coaches in the WNBA isolation zone. In the summer of 2021 before the 2021 WNBA All-Star Game, Wilson designed and released a limited-edition Mountain Dew hoodie and durag commemorating her 2020 MVP award.

In April 2021, Wilson started Burnt Wax Candle Company, a luxury candle line. In August 2022, Wilson became the first female athlete to sign a multi-year sponsorship deal with Ruffles and released a signature chip, Smoky BBQ Ruffles Ridge Twists.

In May 2024, Wilson signed a multi-year endorsement deal with Gatorade and was featured in the company's "IT Hasn't Changed" ad campaign, a revival of its late 1990s "Is It In You?" campaign.

=== In popular culture ===
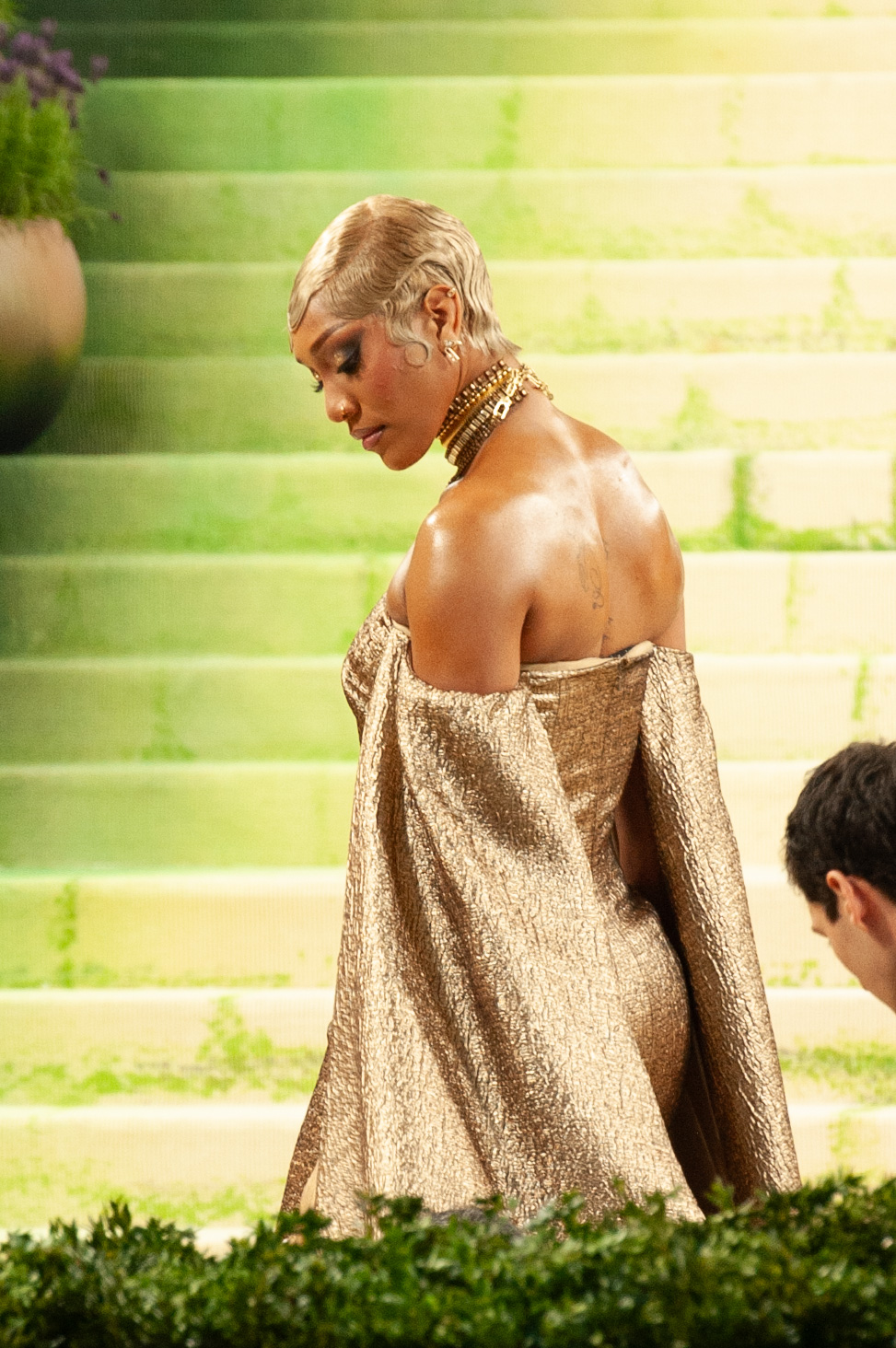
Wilson at the 2026 Met Gala, of which she was a member of the host committee

In 2019, Wilson played for the "Home" roster during the NBA All-Star Celebrity Game at the Bojangles Coliseum in Charlotte, North Carolina. The roster was made up of celebrities with Carolina roots.

In December 2020, Wilson was named to Forbes 30 Under 30 alongside fellow WNBA players, Natasha Cloud and Chiney Ogwumike. In April 2024, Time named Wilson in their 2024 list of the 100 most influential people in the world.

In July 2024, Wilson was named the co-cover athlete for the All-Star edition (alongside Jayson Tatum) and solo cover athlete for the WNBA edition of NBA 2K25, a popular video game, making Wilson the first WNBA player to be featured on a cover of a global edition of the game.

She was named one of Time's Women of the Year for 2025.

When playing basketball, Wilson frequently wears a single sleeve on her left leg, which originally started as a way for her to manage pain from an injury. The single sleeve has been cited as a fashion and sports trend, influencing other basketball players to do the same. In 2024, Wilson began working with Nike to produce a line of leggings specifically designed for the single sleeve.

=== In the media ===
In 2020 and 2021, she and Minnesota Lynx forward, Napheesa Collier, hosted a podcast about the WNBA, Tea with A & Phee, produced by Just Women's Sports.

In February 2024, Wilson published her first book, Dear Black Girls, which became a The New York Times best seller that same month.

==== Commentary on racial bias in marketing of female athletes ====
Days after the announcement of Wilson's signature shoe, the A'One, with Nike, Wilson, in an interview with the Associated Press, agreed when asked, that white female athletes (including Indiana Fever rookie, Caitlin Clark) are often perceived as more marketable than black female athletes. She alluded to her own experience of needing incredible success in the WNBA before garnering high-level sponsorship and business deals (such as a signature shoe) as a black woman: "[corporations] don't see [people of color] as marketable, so it doesn't matter how hard I work. It doesn't matter what we all do as black women." Wilson's comments were made in light of recent reports from The Wall Street Journal and The Athletic that Clark and Nike were in negotiations for an eight-figure endorsement deal, including a signature shoe, effectively making Clark the fifth Caucasian active player in the WNBA (joining Elena Delle Donne, Diana Taurasi, Sabrina Ionescu and Breanna Stewart) with a signature shoe. Before this Nike–Clark deal was reported, many fans, reporters and fellow athletes had been asking for Nike to give Wilson a signature shoe, including Aces' head coach Becky Hammon and NBA star LeBron James, given her accolades and exceptional performance in the WNBA and long-standing sponsorship with Nike.

On May 14, 2024, during the press conference before her professional debut in the WNBA, Clark was asked by Fox News Digital to respond to Wilson's commentary on Clark's rapid rise in popularity in relation to her race and stated, "I think there [are] opportunities for every single player in women's basketball ... the more opportunities we can give across the board, that's what's going to elevate women's basketball." She continued and added, "The parity in women's basketball is what's making more people want to come watch it. ... I've had a lot of fun being in the spotlight and helping grow this game and move it forward, and that's what I'm going to continue to do ... the more we can share the love, the better this league's going to be."

== Records ==
=== WNBA ===
- All-time leader in 40-point games: 4 (Note: Tied with Breanna Stewart and Diana Taurasi)
- All-time leader in consecutive regular-season games with 25+ points: 8 (2024)
- All-time leader in consecutive regular-season games with 20+ points and 8+ rebounds: 18 (2023–24)
- All-time leader in most points scored in first 20 games of the regular season: 540 points (2024)
- Single-game leader in points: 53 (August 22, 2023 at Atlanta) (Note: Tied with Liz Cambage and Marina Mabrey)
- Single-season leader in points: 1,021 (2024)

=== Las Vegas Aces ===
- All-time leader in points
- All-time leader in rebounds

== Awards and honors ==
=== WNBA ===
- 3× WNBA champion (2022, 2023, 2025)
- 8× WNBA All-Star (2018, 2019, 2021, 2022, 2023, 2024, 2025, 2026)
- WNBA Rookie of the Year (2018)
- 5× WNBA Most Valuable Player (2020, 2022, 2024, 2025, 2026)
- 3× WNBA Defensive Player of the Year (2022, 2023, 2025)
- 2× WNBA Finals Most Valuable Player (2023, 2025)
- 3× Best WNBA Player ESPY Award (2023, 2024, 2026)
- 2× Best Female Athlete ESPY Award (2024, 2026)
- AP Female Athlete of the Year (2025)
- Time Magazine Athlete of the Year (2025)
- BET Awards Sportswoman of the Year Award (2026)

=== College ===
- NCAA tournament Most Outstanding Player (2017)
- Wade Trophy (2018)
- John R. Wooden Award (2018)
- Honda Sports Award (2018)
- Naismith College Player of the Year (2018)
- AP Player of the Year (2018)
- USBWA Player of the Year (2018)
- Lisa Leslie Award (2018)
- 3× Consensus first-team All-American (2016–2018)
- Third-team All-American – AP (2014)
- 3× SEC Player of the Year (2016–2018)
- 2x SEC Defensive Player of the Year (2016, 2018)
- 4× First-team All-SEC (2015–2018)
- SEC Freshman of the Year (2015)
- SEC All-Freshman Team (2015)

=== High school ===
- National High School Player of the Year (WBCA, Naismith, Parade) (2014)
- McDonald's All-America (2013–14)
- Parade All-America (2013–14)
- Gatorade South Carolina Girls Basketball Player of the Year (2013–2014)
