= List of WNBA annual blocks leaders =

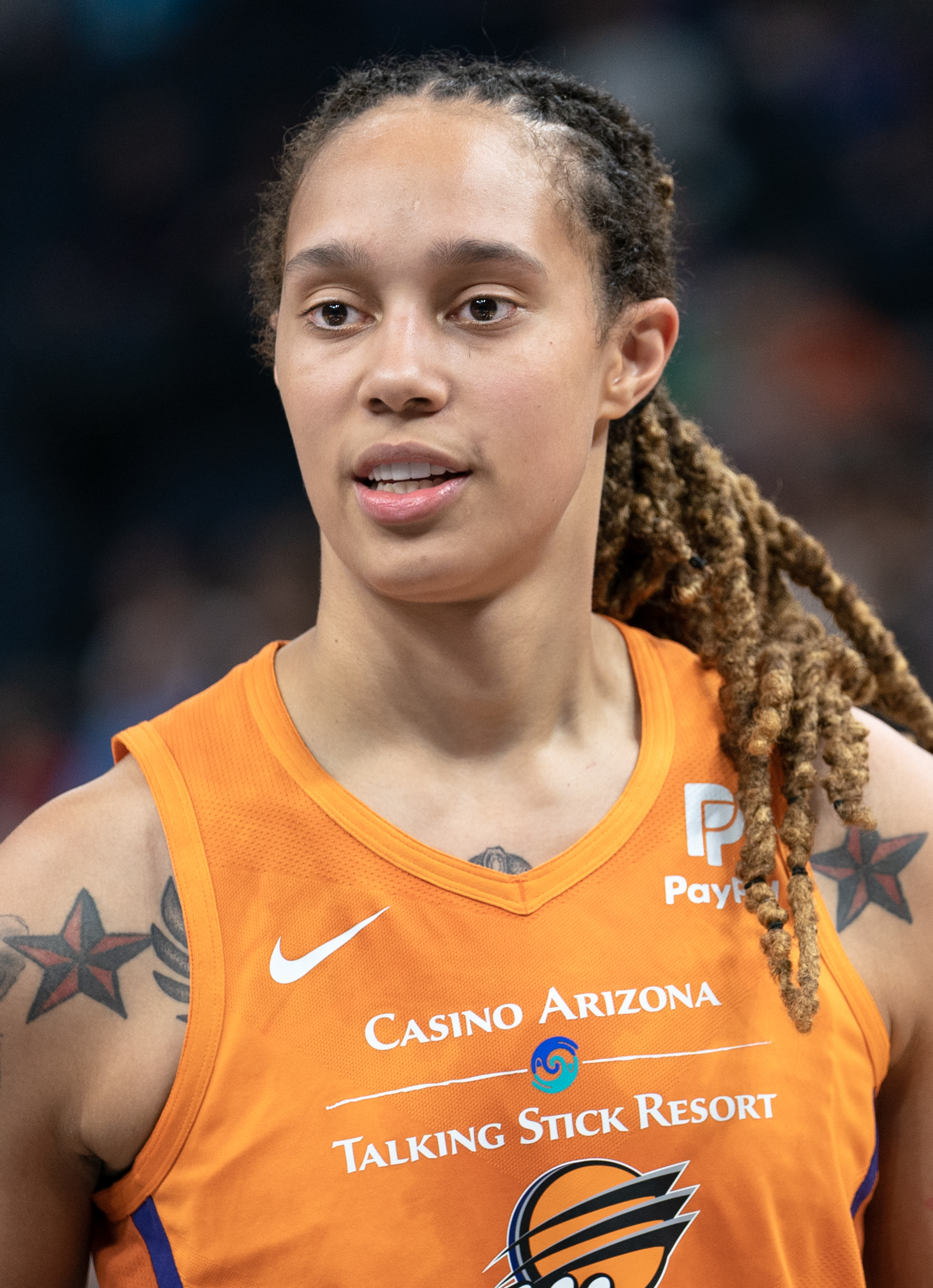
Brittney Griner (pictured) along with Margo Dydek each won eight block titles, the most in WNBA history

In basketball, a blocked shot occurs when a defender deflects or stops a field goal attempt without committing a foul. The Women's National Basketball Association's (WNBA) block title is awarded to the player with the highest blocks per game average in a given season. To qualify for the blocks title, the player must appear in at least 70 percent of the season's games (28 games in typical 40-game season) or record 35 blocks.

Brittney Griner holds the all-time records for total blocks (129) and blocks per game (4.04) in a season; achieving them in the 2014 season and 2015 season respectively.

Griner and Margo Dydek have won the most block titles, with eight. A'ja Wilson has won six block titles. Lisa Leslie, Sylvia Fowles, Candace Parker each have won the title twice.

Griner has also won the most consecutive block titles, with seven accomplishing this in the 2013 season, 2014 season, 2015 season, 2016 season, 2017 season, 2018 season, 2019 season. Other players that have won consecutive block titles include Margo Dydek in the 1998 season, 1999 season, 2000 season, 2001 season, 2002 season, 2003 season, A'ja Wilson in the 2022 season, 2023 season, 2024 season, 2025 season, 2026 season and Sylvia Fowles in the 2010 season, 2011 season.

== Key ==
^		Denotes player who is still active in the WNBA			
*		Inducted into the Naismith Memorial Basketball Hall of Fame			
†		Not yet eligible for Hall of Fame consideration (Note: A player is not eligible for induction into the Naismith Memorial Basketball Hall of Fame until he has been fully retired for two calendar years.)			
§		1st time eligible for Hall of Fame in 2025			
‡		Denotes player who won the Defensive Player of the Year award that year			
Player (X)		Denotes the number of times the player had been the blocks leader up to and including that season			
G	Guard	F	Forward	C	Center

== Annual leaders ==
Season	Player	Pos (Note: The player's primary position is listed first.)	Team(s)	Games played	Total blocks	Blocks per game	Ref
1997	Elena Baranova	F	Utah Starzz	28	63	2.25	
1998	Margo Dydek	C	Utah Starzz	30	114	3.80	
1999	Margo Dydek (2)	C	Utah Starzz	32	77	2.41	
2000	Margo Dydek (3)	C	Utah Starzz	32	96	3.00	
2001	Margo Dydek (4)	C	Utah Starzz	32	113	3.53	
2002	Margo Dydek (5)	C	Utah Starzz	30	107	3.57	
2003	Margo Dydek (6)	C	San Antonio Silver Stars	34	100	2.94	
2004 ‡	Lisa Leslie*	C	Los Angeles Sparks	34	98	2.88	
2005	Maria Stepanova	C	Phoenix Mercury	15	38	2.53	
2006	Margo Dydek (7)	C	Connecticut Sun	34	85	2.50	
2007	Margo Dydek (8)	C	Connecticut Sun	32	66	2.06	
2008 ‡	Lisa Leslie* (2)	C	Los Angeles Sparks	33	97	2.94	
2009	Candace Parker*	F	Los Angeles Sparks	25	53	2.12	
2010	Sylvia Fowles*	C	Chicago Sky	34	88	2.59	
2011 ‡	Sylvia Fowles* (2)	C	Chicago Sky	34	68	2.00	
2012	Candace Parker* (2)	F	Los Angeles Sparks	33	76	2.30	
2013	Brittney Griner^	C	Phoenix Mercury	27	81	3.00	
2014 ‡	Brittney Griner^ (2)	C	Phoenix Mercury	34	129	3.79	
2015 ‡	Brittney Griner^ (3)	C	Phoenix Mercury	26	105	4.04	
2016	Brittney Griner^ (4)	C	Phoenix Mercury	34	107	3.15	
2017	Brittney Griner^ (5)	C	Phoenix Mercury	26	65	2.50	
2018	Brittney Griner^ (6)	C	Phoenix Mercury	34	87	2.56	
2019	Brittney Griner^ (7)	C	Phoenix Mercury	31	62	2.00	
2019	Jonquel Jones^	F/C	Connecticut Sun	34	68	2.00	
2020	A'ja Wilson^	F	Las Vegas Aces	22	44	2.00	
2021	Brittney Griner^ (8)	C	Phoenix Mercury	30	58	1.93	
2022 ‡	A'ja Wilson^ (2)	F	Las Vegas Aces	36	70	1.94	
2023 ‡	A'ja Wilson^ (3)	F	Las Vegas Aces	40	89	2.22	
2024	A'ja Wilson^ (4)	F	Las Vegas Aces	38	98	2.57	
2025	A'ja Wilson^ (5)	C	Las Vegas Aces	40	92	2.30	
2026	A'ja Wilson^ (6)	C	Las Vegas Aces	41	79	1.93	

== Multiple-time leaders ==
Rank	Player	Team	Times leader	Years
1	Brittney Griner	Phoenix Mercury	8	2013, 2014, 2015, 2016, 2017, 2018, 2019, 2021
1	Margo Dydek	Utah Starzz (5) / San Antonio Silver Stars (1) / Connecticut Sun (2)	8	1998, 1999, 2000, 2001, 2002, 2003, 2006, 2007
3	A'ja Wilson	Las Vegas Aces	6	2020, 2022, 2023, 2024, 2025, 2026
4	Candace Parker	Los Angeles Sparks	2	2009, 2012
4	Lisa Leslie	Los Angeles Sparks	2	2004, 2008
4	Sylvia Fowles	Chicago Sky	2	2010, 2011
