= Basketball at the 2024 Summer Olympics – Women's tournament =

Tournament details
- Host country: France
- Dates: 28 July – 11 August
- Teams: 12 (from 5 confederations)
- Venue(s): Stade Pierre-Mauroy; Accor Arena (in 2 host cities)

Final positions
- Champions: United States (10th title)
- Runners-up: France
- Third place: Australia
- Fourth place: Belgium

Tournament statistics
- Games played: 26
- Attendance: 508,060 (19,541 per game)
- MVP: (United States) A'ja Wilson
- Top scorer: (Belgium) Emma Meesseman (23.3 ppg)

The women's 5x5 basketball tournament at the 2024 Summer Olympics was the 21st edition of the event for women at the Summer Olympic Games. It was held from 28 July to 11 August 2024. Preliminary games occurred at Stade Pierre-Mauroy in Lille, with the final phase staged at the Accor Arena (referred to as the Bercy Arena due to IOC rules disallowing Olympic host venues to be named after non-IOC sponsors) in Paris.

The United States won the gold medal after defeating France in the final. Australia captured the bronze medal with a win over Belgium. Diana Taurasi of the victorious American women's national team became the only basketball player with six Olympic gold medals, joining dressage equestrian Isabell Werth of Germany and Hungarian sabre fencer Aladar Gerevich as the only Olympians to win six gold medals in the same event.

== Format ==
The twelve teams were split into three groups of four teams, and a single round-robin was held within each group. The first- and second-placed teams of each group advanced to the quarterfinals as well as the two best third-placed teams. After the preliminary round, the teams were grouped according to their results, and a draw paired teams between the groups for the quarterfinals. For the draw the teams were seeded in four pots, with the top two-ranked teams (Pot D), 3rd–4th ranked teams (Pot E), 5–6th ranked teams (Pot F) and 7–8th ranked teams (Pot G). Teams from Pot D faced a team from Pot G and teams from Pot E a team from Pot F. Teams from the same group could not face each other again. If both teams from Pot D qualified for the semifinals, they could not play against each other.

== Schedule ==
The schedule of the tournament was as follows.

Legend
G	Group stage	¼	Quarter-finals	½	Semi-finals	B	Bronze medal match	F	Gold medal match

Sun 28	Mon 29	Tue 30	Wed 31	Thu 1	Fri 2	Sat 3	Sun 4	Mon 5	Tue 6	Wed 7	Thu 8	Fri 9	Sat 10	Sun 11	
G	G		G	G		G	G			¼		½		B	F

== Qualified teams ==
Qualification method	Date	Venue	Berths	Qualified team
Host nation	—N/a	—N/a	1	France
2022 FIBA Women's Basketball World Cup	22 September – 1 October 2022	(Australia) Sydney	1	United States
2024 FIBA Women's Olympic Qualifying Tournaments	8–11 February 2024	(China) Xi'an	2	China
2024 FIBA Women's Olympic Qualifying Tournaments	8–11 February 2024	(China) Xi'an	2	Puerto Rico
2024 FIBA Women's Olympic Qualifying Tournaments	8–11 February 2024	(Belgium) Antwerp	2	Belgium
2024 FIBA Women's Olympic Qualifying Tournaments	8–11 February 2024	(Belgium) Antwerp	2	Nigeria
2024 FIBA Women's Olympic Qualifying Tournaments	8–11 February 2024	(Brazil) Belém	3	Australia
2024 FIBA Women's Olympic Qualifying Tournaments	8–11 February 2024	(Brazil) Belém	3	Germany
2024 FIBA Women's Olympic Qualifying Tournaments	8–11 February 2024	(Brazil) Belém	3	Serbia
2024 FIBA Women's Olympic Qualifying Tournaments	8–11 February 2024	(Hungary) Sopron	3	Japan
2024 FIBA Women's Olympic Qualifying Tournaments	8–11 February 2024	(Hungary) Sopron	3	Spain
2024 FIBA Women's Olympic Qualifying Tournaments	8–11 February 2024	(Hungary) Sopron	3	Canada
Total			12	

== Squads ==
Each roster consisted of 12 players.

== Draw ==
The draw was held on 19 March 2024.

The 12 teams were divided into four pots of three teams based on their FIBA World Ranking. The three groups were formed by drawing one team from each pot. Two teams from the same continent could not be placed into the same group, with the exception of European teams, where up to two teams could be in the same group.

For broadcast purposes, defending champions the United States and hosts France were both to be drawn into either Group B or C.

=== Seeding ===
The seeding was announced on 15 March 2024.

Pot 1	Pot 2	Pot 3	Pot 4
United States; China; Australia	Spain; Canada; Belgium	France; Japan; Serbia	Puerto Rico; Nigeria; Germany

== Referees ==
The following 30 referees were selected for the tournament.

- (Argentina) Juan Fernández
- (Australia) James Boyer
- (Bosnia and Herzegovina) Ademir Zurapović
- (Canada) Matthew Kallio
- (Canada) Maripier Malo
- (Croatia) Martin Vulić
- (Denmark) Maj Forsberg
- (Ecuador) Carlos Peralta
- (France) Yohan Rosso
- (Hungary) Péter Praksch
- (Japan) Takaki Kato
- (Kazakhstan) Yevgeniy Mikheyev
- (Latvia) Mārtiņš Kozlovskis
- (Latvia) Gatis Saliņš
- (Lebanon) Rabah Noujaim
- (Madagascar) Yann Davidson
- (Mexico) Omar Bermúdez
- (Norway) Viola Györgyi
- (Panama) Julio Anaya
- (Poland) Wojciech Liszka
- (Puerto Rico) Johnny Batista
- (Puerto Rico) Roberto Vázquez
- (Slovenia) Boris Krejić
- (Spain) Luis Castillo
- (Spain) Ariadna Chueca
- (Spain) Antonio Conde
- (Uruguay) Andrés Bartel
- (United States) Amy Bonner
- (United States) Blanca Burns
- (United States) Jenna Reneau

== Preliminary round ==
All times are local (UTC+2).

=== Group A ===
Pos	Team	Pld	W	L	PF	PA	PD	Pts	Qualification
1	Spain	3	3	0	223	213	+10	6	Quarterfinals
2	Serbia	3	2	1	201	184	+17	5	Quarterfinals
3	China	3	1	2	228	229	−1	4	
4	Puerto Rico	3	0	3	175	201	−26	3	

Source: FIBA
Rules for classification: 1) classification points; 2) head-to-head results; 3) head-to-head game points difference; 4) head-to-head number of game points scored.

28 July 2024
13:30

Boxscore

Spain	90–89 (OT)	China
Scoring by quarter: 13–22, 20–15, 20–22, 23–17, Overtime: 14–13
Pts: Gustafson 29; Rebs: Gustafson 8 Asts: Casas 8		Pts: Li Y. 31; Rebs: Li Y. 15; Asts: Li M. 11

Stade Pierre-Mauroy, Lille
Attendance: 27,021
Referees: Viola Györgyi (NOR), Maripier Malo (CAN), Péter Praksch (HUN)

28 July 2024
21:00

Boxscore

Serbia	58–55	Puerto Rico
Scoring by quarter: 23–15, 20–11, 12–10, 3–19
Pts: Stanković 15; Rebs: Stanković 10; Asts: Anderson 8		Pts: San Antonio 11; Rebs: three players 6 Asts: Rosado 7

Stade Pierre-Mauroy, Lille
Attendance: 15,324
Referees: Maj Forsberg (DEN), James Boyer (AUS), Yann Davidson (MAD)

31 July 2024
11:00

Boxscore

Puerto Rico	62–63	Spain
Scoring by quarter: 9–18, 16–21, 19–5, 18–19
Pts: Guirantes 15; Rebs: Hollingshed 12; Asts: Guirantes 4		Pts: Gustafson 18; Rebs: Gustafson 13; Asts: Ortiz

Stade Pierre-Mauroy, Lille
Attendance: 23,942
Referees: Andrés Bartel (URU), Maripier Malo (CAN), Yevgeniy Mikheyev (KAZ)

31 July 2024
13:30

Boxscore

China	59–81	Serbia
Scoring by quarter: 17–23, 22–22, 11–17, 9–19
Pts: Han, Wang 11; Rebs: Li Yue. 11; Asts: Wang, Yang L. 5		Pts: Anderson 15; Rebs: Krajišnik 11; Asts: Anderson 6

Stade Pierre-Mauroy, Lille
Attendance: 23,942
Referees: Martin Vulić (CRO), Maj Forsberg (DEN), James Boyer (AUS)

3 August 2024
11:00

Boxscore

China	80–58	Puerto Rico
Scoring by quarter: 17–11, 23–18, 22–16, 18–13
Pts: Li M. 18; Rebs: Han 9 Asts: Li M. 7		Pts: Guirantes 20; Rebs: Hollingshed 8 Asts: Rosado 5

Stade Pierre-Mauroy, Lille
Attendance: 26,595
Referees: Omar Bermúdez (MEX), Rabah Noujaim (LBN), Maripier Malo (CAN)

3 August 2024
13:30

Boxscore

Serbia	62–70	Spain
Scoring by quarter: 13–16, 15–21, 10–18, 24–15
Pts: Anderson 18; Rebs: Stanković 5 Asts: Anderson 7		Pts: Conde 15; Rebs: Gustafson 9 Asts: Gil 7

Stade Pierre-Mauroy, Lille
Attendance: 26,595
Referees: Takaki Kato (JPN), Viola Györgyi (NOR), Yann Davidson (MAD)

=== Group B ===
Pos	Team	Pld	W	L	PF	PA	PD	Pts	Qualification
1	France (H)	3	2	1	222	187	+35	5 (Note: France 3 Pts, +14 PD; Australia 3 Pts, −6 PD; Nigeria 3 Pts, −8 PD.)	Quarterfinals
2	Australia	3	2	1	211	212	−1	5	Quarterfinals
3	Nigeria	3	2	1	208	207	+1	5	Quarterfinals
4	Canada	3	0	3	189	224	−35	3	

Source: FIBA
Rules for classification: 1) classification points; 2) head-to-head results; 3) head-to-head game points difference; 4) head-to-head number of game points scored.
(H) Hosts
Notes:

29 July 2024
11:00

Boxscore

Nigeria	75–62	Australia
Scoring by quarter: 18–17, 23–11, 10–19, 24–15
Pts: Kalu 19; Rebs: Kunaiyi-Akpannah, Musa 7 Asts: Amukamara 9		Pts: Smith 15; Rebs: Talbot 10; Asts: Talbot 12

Stade Pierre-Mauroy, Lille
Attendance: 24,023
Referees: Amy Bonner (USA), Rabah Noujaim (LBN), Jenna Reneau (USA)

29 July 2024
17:15

Boxscore

Canada	54–75	France
Scoring by quarter: 18–15, 2–23, 16–15, 18–22
Pts: Colley, Nurse 11; Rebs: Alexander 10; Asts: Colley 6		Pts: Badiane 13; Rebs: Badiane 6 Asts: Williams 8

Stade Pierre-Mauroy, Lille
Attendance: 20,211
Referees: Boris Krejić (SLO), Blanca Burns (USA), Ariadna Chueca (ESP)

1 August 2024
13:30

Boxscore

Australia	70–65	Canada
Scoring by quarter: 18–16, 20–16, 13–12, 19–21
Pts: Whitcomb 19; Rebs: Talbot 9 Asts: Whitcomb 10		Pts: Carleton 19; Rebs: Carleton 8 Asts: Achonwa 8

Stade Pierre-Mauroy, Lille
Attendance: 20,962
Referees: Andrés Bartel (URU), Rabah Noujaim (LBN), Jenna Reneau (USA)

1 August 2024
17:15

Boxscore

France	75–54	Nigeria
Scoring by quarter: 24–20, 14–11, 16–8, 21–15
Pts: Johannès 15; Rebs: Badiane 6 Asts: Williams 7		Pts: Kalu 18; Rebs: Musa 9 Asts: Amukamara 5

Stade Pierre-Mauroy, Lille
Attendance: 17,483
Referees: Amy Bonner (USA), Carlos Peralta (ECU), Péter Praksch (HUN)

4 August 2024
13:30

Boxscore

Canada	70–79	Nigeria
Scoring by quarter: 18–18, 23–19, 5–23, 24–19
Pts: Colley 17; Rebs: Amihere 11; Asts: five players 2		Pts: Kalu 21; Rebs: Kunaiyi-Akpannah 7 Asts: Amukamara 6

Stade Pierre-Mauroy, Lille
Attendance: 27,107
Referees: Amy Bonner (USA), Blanca Burns (USA), Ariadna Chueca (ESP)

4 August 2024
21:00

Boxscore

Australia	79–72	France
Scoring by quarter: 19–17, 15–17, 25–16, 20–22
Pts: Madgen 18; Rebs: Magbegor, Talbot 6 Asts: Whitcomb 7		Pts: Williams 15; Rebs: Badiane 6 Asts: Bernies 4

Stade Pierre-Mauroy, Lille
Attendance: 27,193
Referees: Luis Castillo (ESP), Maj Forsberg (DEN), Jenna Reneau (USA)

=== Group C ===
Pos	Team	Pld	W	L	PF	PA	PD	Pts	Qualification
1	United States	3	3	0	276	218	+58	6	Quarterfinals
2	Germany	3	2	1	226	220	+6	5	Quarterfinals
3	Belgium	3	1	2	228	228	0	4	Quarterfinals
4	Japan	3	0	3	198	262	−64	3	

Source: FIBA
Rules for classification: 1) classification points; 2) head-to-head results; 3) head-to-head game points difference; 4) head-to-head number of game points scored.

29 July 2024
13:30

Boxscore

Germany	83–69	Belgium
Scoring by quarter: 25–11, 21–14, 14–17, 23–27
Pts: S. Sabally 17; Rebs: Gülich 7 Asts: Peterson 8		Pts: Meesseman 25; Rebs: Linskens 6 Asts: Vanloo 6

Stade Pierre-Mauroy, Lille
Attendance: 20,211
Referees: Martin Vulić (CRO), Carlos Peralta (ECU), Yann Davidson (MAD)

29 July 2024
21:00

Boxscore

United States	102–76	Japan
Scoring by quarter: 22–15, 28–24, 29–18, 23–19
Pts: Wilson 24; Rebs: Wilson 13; Asts: Gray 13		Pts: Takada 24; Rebs: four players 3 Asts: Machida, Yamamoto 5

Stade Pierre-Mauroy, Lille
Attendance: 13,040
Referees: Luis Castillo (ESP), Viola Györgyi (NOR), Yevgeniy Mikheyev (KAZ)

1 August 2024
11:00

Boxscore

Japan	64–75	Germany
Scoring by quarter: 16–21, 20–21, 13–17, 15–16
Pts: Takada 15; Rebs: Akaho 8 Asts: Machida 9		Pts: S. Sabally 33; Rebs: Gülich, Geiselsöder 10; Asts: Fiebich 6

Stade Pierre-Mauroy, Lille
Attendance: 20,962
Referees: Gatis Saliņš (LAT), Viola Györgyi (NOR), Yevgeniy Mikheyev (KAZ)

1 August 2024
21:00

Boxscore

Belgium	74–87	United States
Scoring by quarter: 23–23, 15–23, 15–14, 21–27
Pts: Meesseman 24; Rebs: Delaere, Linskens 5 Asts: Delaere 8		Pts: Stewart 26; Rebs: Wilson 13; Asts: Ionescu 5

Stade Pierre-Mauroy, Lille
Attendance: 25,044
Referees: Wojciech Liszka (POL), Luis Castillo (ESP), Ariadna Chueca (ESP)

4 August 2024
11:00

Boxscore

Japan	58–85	Belgium
Scoring by quarter: 7–19, 16–20, 16–22, 19–24
Pts: Hayashi 13; Rebs: Akaho 5 Asts: Machida, Miyazaki 4		Pts: Meesseman 30; Rebs: Meesseman 11; Asts: Massey 7

Stade Pierre-Mauroy, Lille
Attendance: 25,134
Referees: Boris Krejić (SLO), Wojciech Liszka (POL), Péter Praksch (HUN)

4 August 2024
17:15

Boxscore

Germany	68–87	United States
Scoring by quarter: 19–16, 10–25, 17–28, 22–18
Pts: S. Sabally 15; Rebs: Geiselsöder 8 Asts: Peterson 4		Pts: Young 19; Rebs: Collier 7 Asts: three players 5

Stade Pierre-Mauroy, Lille
Attendance: 25,844
Referees: Julio Anaya (PAN), Gatis Saliņš (LAT), Viola Györgyi (NOR)

=== Third-placed teams ranking ===
Pos	Grp	Team	Pld	W	L	PF	PA	PD	Pts	Qualification
1	B	Nigeria	3	2	1	208	207	+1	5	Quarterfinals
2	C	Belgium	3	1	2	228	228	0	4	Quarterfinals
3	A	China	3	1	2	228	229	−1	4	

Source: FIBA
Rules for classification: 1) classification points; 2) game points difference; 3) number of game points scored; 4) FIBA ranking.

== Knockout stage ==
A draw after the preliminary round decided the pairings, where a seeded team played an unseeded team. Teams qualified were divided into four pots:

- Pot D comprised the top two-ranked first-placed teams from the group phase.
- Pot E comprised the lowest ranked first-placed team and the best-ranked second-placed team from the group phase.
- Pot F comprised the remaining second-placed teams from the group phase.
- Pot G comprised the two best third-placed teams.

Draw principles:

- Teams from Pot D were drawn against a team from Pot G and a team from Pot E against a team of Pot F.
- Teams from the same group could not be drawn against each other in the quarterfinals.

=== Ranking ===
Pos	Team	Pld	W	L	PF	PA	PD	Pts	Qualification
1	United States	3	3	0	276	218	+58	6	Seeded (Pot D)
2	Spain	3	3	0	223	213	+10	6	Seeded (Pot D)
3	France	3	2	1	222	187	+35	5	Seeded (Pot E)
4	Serbia	3	2	1	201	184	+17	5	Seeded (Pot E)
5	Germany	3	2	1	226	220	+6	5	Unseeded (Pot F)
6	Australia	3	2	1	211	212	−1	5	Unseeded (Pot F)
7	Nigeria	3	2	1	208	207	+1	5	Unseeded (Pot G)
8	Belgium	3	1	2	228	228	0	4	Unseeded (Pot G)

Source: Olympics
Rules for classification: 1) points; 2) points difference; 3) points scored.

=== Bracket ===
Quarterfinals
7 August
Germany	71
France	84
7 August
Spain	66
Belgium	79
7 August
Nigeria	74
United States	88
7 August
Serbia	67
Australia	85

Semifinals
9 August
France (OT)	81
Belgium	75
9 August
United States	85
Australia	64

Gold medal
11 August
France	66
United States	67
Bronze medal
11 August
Belgium	81
Australia	85

=== Quarterfinals ===
7 August 2024
11:00

Boxscore

Serbia	67–85	Australia
Scoring by quarter: 19–26, 13–22, 16–24, 19–13
Pts: Nogić 17; Rebs: Raca 7 Asts: Anderson, Nogić 5		Pts: Smith 22; Rebs: Smith 13; Asts: Melbourne 5

Accor Arena, Paris
Attendance: 12,337
Referees: Martin Vulić (CRO), Ariadna Chueca (ESP), Yevgeniy Mikheyev (KAZ)

7 August 2024
14:30

Boxscore

Spain	66–79	Belgium
Scoring by quarter: 26–26, 11–22, 12–19, 17–12
Pts: Gustafson 21; Rebs: Gustafson 7 Asts: Gil, Ortiz 3		Pts: Linskens, Meesseman 19; Rebs: Meesseman 9 Asts: Delaere, Vanloo 7

Accor Arena, Paris
Attendance: 11,852
Referees: Matthew Kallio (CAN), Jenna Reneau (USA), Maripier Malo (CAN)

7 August 2024
18:00

Boxscore

Germany	71–84	France
Scoring by quarter: 19–23, 14–22, 16–21, 22–18
Pts: N. Sabally 20; Rebs: N. Sabally 13; Asts: Fiebich, Peterson 3		Pts: Johannès 24; Rebs: Williams 6 Asts: Williams 5

Accor Arena, Paris
Attendance: 12,399
Referees: Amy Bonner (USA), Carlos Peralta (ECU), Blanca Burns (USA)

7 August 2024
21:30

Boxscore

Nigeria	74–88	United States
Scoring by quarter: 17–26, 16–26, 15–24, 26–12
Pts: Amukamara 19; Rebs: Kunaiyi-Akpannah 8 Asts: Kalu 7		Pts: Wilson 20; Rebs: Wilson 11; Asts: Thomas 6

Accor Arena, Paris
Attendance: 12,437
Referees: Viola Györgyi (NOR), Juan Fernández (ARG), Yann Davidson (MAD)

=== Semifinals ===
9 August 2024
17:30

Boxscore

United States	85–64	Australia
Scoring by quarter: 20–16, 25–11, 21–13, 19–24
Pts: Young 14; Rebs: Wilson 8 Asts: three players 5		Pts: Borlase 11; Rebs: Smith 7 Asts: three players 3

Accor Arena, Paris
Attendance: 11,919
Referees: Gatis Saliņš (LAT), Viola Györgyi (NOR), Péter Praksch (HUN)

9 August 2024
21:00

Boxscore

France	81–75 (OT)	Belgium
Scoring by quarter: 14–17, 17–19, 17–15, 18–15, Overtime: 15–9
Pts: Williams 18; Rebs: Badiane, Rupert 7 Asts: Johannès 5		Pts: Meesseman 19; Rebs: Meesseman 14; Asts: three players 6

Accor Arena, Paris
Attendance: 12,389
Referees: Luis Castillo (ESP), Takaki Kato (JPN), Ariadna Chueca (ESP)

=== Bronze medal game ===
11 August 2024
11:30

Boxscore

Belgium	81–85	Australia
Scoring by quarter: 19–20, 17–17, 25–23, 20–25
Pts: Vanloo 26; Rebs: Linskens 8 Asts: Vanloo 11		Pts: Magbegor 30; Rebs: Magbegor 13; Asts: Melbourne 7

Accor Arena, Paris
Attendance: 11,968
Referees: Amy Bonner (USA), Blanca Burns (USA), Jenna Reneau (USA)

=== Gold medal game ===
11 August 2024
15:30

Boxscore

France	66–67	United States
Scoring by quarter: 9–15, 16–10, 18–20, 23–22
Pts: Williams 19; Rebs: Williams 7 Asts: Badiane 3		Pts: Wilson 21; Rebs: Wilson 13; Asts: Gray, Plum 4

Accor Arena, Paris
Attendance: 12,126
Referees: Boris Krejić (SLO), Viola Györgyi (NOR), Martin Vulić (CRO)

Team details

France	United States

PF	6	Alexia Chery
SG	10	Sarah Michel (c)
C	12	Iliana Rupert
C	14	Dominique Malonga
SG	23	Marine Johannès
G	42	Leïla Lacan
PG	47	Romane Bernies
PG	4	Marine Fauthoux
SF	11	Valériane Ayayi
F	13	Janelle Salaün
F	15	Gabby Williams
C	22	Marième Badiane
Head Coach:
(France) Jean-Aimé Toupane

G	4	Jewell Loyd
G	5	Kelsey Plum
G	6	Sabrina Ionescu
SF	7	Kahleah Copper
SG	12	Diana Taurasi
PF	14	Alyssa Thomas
C	15	Brittney Griner
G	8	Chelsea Gray
C	9	A'ja Wilson
PF	10	Breanna Stewart
SF	11	Napheesa Collier
G	13	Jackie Young
Head Coach:
(United States) Cheryl Reeve

== Result ==
2024 Women's Olympic Basketball Champions

United States
Tenth title

== Final ranking ==
Pos	Team	Pld	W	L
1st place, gold medalist(s)	United States	6	6	0
2nd place, silver medalist(s)	France	6	4	2
3rd place, bronze medalist(s)	Australia	6	4	2
4	Belgium	6	2	4
5	Spain	4	3	1
6	Serbia	4	2	2
7	Germany	4	2	2
8	Nigeria	4	2	2
9	China	3	1	2
10	Puerto Rico	3	0	3
11	Canada	3	0	3
12	Japan	3	0	3

Source: Olympics

=== Statistical leaders ===
==== Players ====
Points

Player	PPG
(Belgium) Emma Meesseman	23.3
(Germany) Satou Sabally	18.8
(United States) A'ja Wilson	18.7
(Nigeria) Ezinne Kalu	18.5
(Spain) Megan Gustafson	18.0

Rebounds

Player	RPG
(China) Li Yueru	11.0
(United States) A'ja Wilson	10.2
(Spain) Megan Gustafson	9.3
(Puerto Rico) Mya Hollingshed	8.7
(Australia) Alanna Smith	8.0

Assists

Player	APG
(Belgium) Julie Vanloo	6.8
(Serbia) Yvonne Anderson	6.5
(China) Li Meng	6.0
(China) Yang Liwei	6.0
(Japan) Rui Machida	6.0

Blocks

Player	BPG
(United States) A'ja Wilson	2.7
(Belgium) Emma Meesseman	2.5
(United States) Breanna Stewart	1.7
(Australia) Ezi Magbegor	1.5
(Serbia) Dragana Stanković	1.3
(Belgium) Kyara Linskens	1.3
(France) Marième Badiane	1.3

Steals

Player	SPG
(Puerto Rico) Trinity San Antonio	3.0
(Nigeria) Promise Amukamara	3.0
(France) Gabby Williams	2.8
(Serbia) Yvonne Anderson	2.5
(Nigeria) Ezinne Kalu	2.5
(Germany) Leonie Fiebich	2.5

Efficiency

Player	EFFPG
(Belgium) Emma Meesseman	28.5
(United States) A'ja Wilson	25.7
(Spain) Megan Gustafson	23.0
(China) Li Yueru	21.7
(United States) Breanna Stewart	20.3

==== Teams ====
Points

Team	PPG
United States	86.0
Belgium	77.2
China	76.0
France	75.5
Germany	74.3

Rebounds

Team	RPG
United States	47.5
China	42.7
Australia	40.2
Canada	39.7
Germany	39.3

Assists

Team	APG
United States	27.7
Belgium	24.2
China	24.0
Australia	21.3
Spain	20.8

Blocks

Team	BPG
United States	6.0
Belgium	5.2
France	4.2
Australia	3.7
Canada	3.0

Steals

Team	SPG
Nigeria	12.0
France	11.7
Serbia	11.5
Spain	9.5
Puerto Rico	8.7

Efficiency

Team	EFFPG
United States	115.8
Belgium	92.7
China	89.0
Australia	88.2
France	86.2

== Awards ==
The awards were announced by FIBA on 11 August 2024, following the conclusion of the tournament.

FIBA All-Star Five
Forwards		Center
(United States) Breanna Stewart (France) Gabby Williams (Australia) Alanna Smith (Belgium) Emma Meesseman		(United States) A'ja Wilson
FIBA All-Second Team
Guards	Forwards	Centers
(Nigeria) Ezinne Kalu (Belgium) Julie Vanloo	(Germany) Satou Sabally (France) Valériane Ayayi	(Australia) Ezi Magbegor
MVP: (United States) A'ja Wilson
Rising Star: (Australia) Jade Melbourne
Best Defensive Player: (France) Gabby Williams
Best Coach: (Nigeria) Rena Wakama

== See also ==
- Basketball at the 2024 Summer Olympics – Men's tournament
