= 2026 WNBA playoffs =

Women's professional basketball tournament

- Dates: September 27 – October 31, 2026

Final positions
- Champions: Golden State Valkyries
- Runners-up: Atlanta Dream

Tournament statistics
- Scoring leader (s): Gabby Williams (Golden State) (21.0 PPG)

Awards
- MVP: Gabby Williams (Golden State)

The 2026 WNBA playoffs is the postseason tournament of the Women's National Basketball Association's 2026 season. The playoffs began on September 27, 2026.

== Overview ==
=== Updates to postseason appearances ===
- The Las Vegas Aces entered the postseason for their eighth consecutive season, the longest active postseason appearance streak in the WNBA.
- The New York Liberty entered the postseason for the sixth consecutive season, the second longest active postseason appearance streak in the WNBA.
- The Atlanta Dream and Minnesota Lynx entered the postseason for their fourth consecutive season.
- The Indiana Fever entered the postseason for their third consecutive season.
- The Golden State Valkyries entered the postseason for their second consecutive season.
- The Dallas Wings and Washington Mystics entered the postseason for the first time since 2023.
- The Chicago Sky missed the postseason for the third consecutive season.
- The Connecticut Sun missed the postseason for the second consecutive season.
- The Phoenix Mercury and Seattle Storm missed the postseason, ending a two-season postseason streak.
- The Portland Fire and Toronto Tempo missed the postseason.
- The Los Angeles Sparks missed the postseason for the sixth consecutive season, the longest active postseason drought in the WNBA.

== Format ==
The first round of the WNBA playoffs consists of a best-of-three series, with the following matchups: No. 1 vs. No. 8, No. 2 vs. No. 7, No. 3 vs. No. 6, and No. 4 vs. No. 5. The higher seed in the first round had home-court advantage in Games 1 and, if necessary, 3.

In the semifinals of the postseason, a best-of-five series, the higher seed hosted Games 1, 2 and, if necessary, 5. Additionally, the WNBA Finals will be a best-of-seven format for the second time in the league's history. Games 1 and 2, as well as Games 5 and 7, if necessary, was hosted by the higher seed.

== Playoff qualifying ==
Seed	Team	Record	Clinched
Seed	Team	Record	Playoff berth
1	Minnesota Lynx	33–11	August 9
2	Golden State Valkyries	32–12	August 17
3	Las Vegas Aces	31–13	August 13
4	Atlanta Dream	30–14	August 22
5	Washington Mystics	28–16	August 23
6	Indiana Fever	28–16	August 21
7	Dallas Wings	27–17	August 25
8	New York Liberty	26–18	August 23

== Bracket ==
**First round** Best-of-3
1	Minnesota Lynx	0
8	**New York Liberty**	**2**
4	**Atlanta Dream**	**2**
5	Washington Mystics	0
2	**Golden State Valkyries**	**2**
7	Dallas Wings	1
3	**Las Vegas Aces**	**2**
6	Indiana Fever	1

**Semifinals**; Best-of-5
8	New York Liberty	0
4	**Atlanta Dream**	**3**
2	**Golden State Valkyries**	**3**
3	Las Vegas Aces	0

**Finals**; Best-of-7
4	Atlanta Dream	3
2	**Golden State Valkyries**	**4**

- **Bold** – Series winner
- Italic – Team with home-court-advantage

== First round ==
=== (1) Minnesota Lynx vs. (8) New York Liberty ===
==== Game 1 ====
ABC

September 27
2 PM ET

Recap

**New York Liberty** **91**, Minnesota Lynx 75
Scoring by quarter: **25**–18, 15–**26**, **25**–16, **26**–15
Pts: Breanna Stewart 34; Rebs: Breanna Stewart 12; Asts: Ionescu, Stewart 6	Pts: Nia Brodie 16; Rebs: Olivia Miles 8 Asts: Kayla McBride 6
**New York leads series, 1–0**

Target Center
Attendance: 12,339
Referees: Roy Gulbeyan, Fatou Cissoko-Stephens, Sarah Williams

==== Game 2 ====
USA Network

September 29
8:30 PM ET

Recap

Minnesota Lynx 71, **New York Liberty** **87**
Scoring by quarter: 21–**26**, 16–**23**, 19–19, 15–**19**
Pts: Courtney Williams 18; Rebs: Courtney Williams 8 Asts: Courtney Williams 5	Pts: Jones, Stewart 21; Rebs: Jonquel Jones 13; Asts: Sabrina Ionescu 7
**New York won series, 2–0**

Barclays Center
Attendance: 17,593
Referees: Tiara Cruse, Timothy Greene, Ryan Sassano

Regular-season series
New York won 2–1 in the regular-season series

=== (2) Golden State Valkyries vs. (7) Dallas Wings ===
==== Game 1 ====
USA Network

September 27
9 PM ET

Recap

Dallas Wings 80, **Golden State Valkyries** **104**
Scoring by quarter: 20–**21**, 11–**37**, 25–**27**, **24**–19
Pts: Paige Bueckers 21; Rebs: Paige Bueckers 6 Asts: Odyssey Sims 7	Pts: Cecilia Zandalasini 22; Rebs: Kiah Stokes 8 Asts: Veronica Burton 5
**Golden State leads series, 1–0**

Chase Center
Attendance: 18,064
Referees: Tim Greene, Maj Forsberg, Charles Watson

==== Game 2 ====
ESPN

September 30
9 PM ET

Recap

Golden State Valkyries 100, **Dallas Wings** **108** (OT)
Scoring by quarter: **26**–23, 19–**27**, **29**–22, 19–**21**, Overtime: 7–**15**
Pts: Gabby Williams 36; Rebs: Thornton, Williams 6 Asts: Gabby Williams 7	Pts: Arike Ogunbowale 45; Rebs: Jessica Shepard 8 Asts: Jessica Shepard 6
**Series tied, 1–1**

College Park Center
Attendance: 6,251
Referees: Roy Gulbeyan, Isaac Barnett, Angelica Suffren

==== Game 3 ====
ESPN2

October 2
9 PM ET

Recap

Dallas Wings 73, **Golden State Valkyries** **77**
Scoring by quarter: **19**–14, **25**–23, 15–**17**, 14–**23**
Pts: Arike Ogunbowale 30; Rebs: Jessica Shepard 12; Asts: Paige Bueckers 6	Pts: Gabby Williams 19; Rebs: Kiah Stokes 13; Asts: Veronica Burton 6
**Golden State won series, 2–1**

Chase Center
Attendance: 18,064
Referees: Fatou Cissoko-Stephens, Kevin Fahy, Marcy Williams

Regular-season series
Golden State won 3–0 in the regular-season series

=== (3) Las Vegas Aces vs. (6) Indiana Fever ===
==== Game 1 ====
ABC

September 27
4 PM ET

Recap

Indiana Fever 85, **Las Vegas Aces** **102**
Scoring by quarter: 23–**27**, 24–**35**, 18–**24**, **20**–16
Pts: Aliyah Boston 18; Rebs: Aliyah Boston 8 Asts: Caitlin Clark 10	Pts: A'ja Wilson 38; Rebs: A'ja Wilson 16; Asts: Jackie Young 10
**Las Vegas leads series, 1–0**

Michelob Ultra Arena
Attendance: 10,207
Referees: Isaac Barnett, Amy Bonner, Marcy Williams

==== Game 2 ====
Prime Video

September 29
6:30 PM ET

Recap

Las Vegas Aces 89, **Indiana Fever** **99**
Scoring by quarter: **26**–18, 17–**30**, 17–**24**, **29**–27
Pts: Jackie Young 31; Rebs: A'ja Wilson 9 Asts: Chelsea Gray 7	Pts: Caitlin Clark 27; Rebs: Clark, Hull 7 Asts: Caitlin Clark 15
**Series tied, 1–1**

Gainbridge Fieldhouse
Attendance: 16,298
Referees: Randy Richardson, Maj Forsberg, Angel Kent

==== Game 3 ====
USA Network

October 1
9 PM ET

Recap

Indiana Fever 83, **Las Vegas Aces** **94**
Scoring by quarter: 31–31, 17–**23**, **17**–16, 18–**24**
Pts: Kelsey Mitchell 23; Rebs: Myisha Hines-Allen 12; Asts: Caitlin Clark 4	Pts: A'ja Wilson 36; Rebs: A'ja Wilson 10; Asts: Jackie Young 7
**Las Vegas won series, 2–1**

Michelob Ultra Arena
Attendance: 10,388
Referees: Tiara Cruse, Timothy Greene, Ryan Sassano

Regular-season series
Indiana won 2–1 in the regular-season series

=== (4) Atlanta Dream vs. (5) Washington Mystics ===
==== Game 1 ====
Prime Video

September 27
7 PM ET

Recap

Washington Mystics 77, **Atlanta Dream** **92**
Scoring by quarter: **26**–21, 15–15, 12–**29**, 24–**27**
Pts: Sonia Citron 25; Rebs: Shakira Austin 16; Asts: Amoore, Citron, McMahon 3	Pts: Rhyne Howard 26; Rebs: Angel Reese 12; Asts: Jordin Canada 10
**Atlanta leads series, 1–0**

State Farm Arena
Attendance: 9,766
Referees: Tiara Cruse, Randy Richardson, Agon Abazi

==== Game 2 ====
ESPN

September 30
7 PM ET

Recap

**Atlanta Dream** **93**, Washington Mystics 75
Scoring by quarter: **24**–17, 17–**18**, **24**–23, **28**–17
Pts: Allisha Gray 22; Rebs: Canada, Reese 7 Asts: Jordin Canada 11	Pts: Sonia Citron 25; Rebs: Kiki Iriafen 16; Asts: Georgia Amoore 4
**Atlanta won series, 2–0**

CareFirst Arena
Attendance: 4,200
Referees: Fatou Cissoko-Stephens, Kevin Fahy, Ashley Gloss

Regular-season series
Washington won 2–1 in the regular-season series

== Semifinals ==
=== (2) Golden State Valkyries vs. (3) Las Vegas Aces ===
==== Game 1 ====
NBC

October 4
4 PM ET

Recap

Las Vegas Aces 60, **Golden State Valkyries** **71**
Scoring by quarter: 18–**22**, **13**–12, 17–**22**, 12–**15**
Pts: A'ja Wilson 24; Rebs: Brianna Turner 7 Asts: Jackie Young 5	Pts: Gabby Williams 25; Rebs: Kiah Stokes 14; Asts: Gabby Williams 5
**Golden State leads series, 1–0**

Chase Center
Attendance: 18,064
Referees: Randy Richardson, Amy Bonner, Agon Abazi

==== Game 2 ====
NBCSN

October 7
9:30 PM ET

Recap

Las Vegas Aces 81, **Golden State Valkyries** **83**
Scoring by quarter: 11–**19**, 20–**23**, 24–24, **26**–17
Pts: A'ja Wilson 24; Rebs: Kalani Brown 8 Asts: Jackie Young 8	Pts: Tiffany Hayes 21; Rebs: Kiah Stokes 7 Asts: Burton, Williams 3
**Golden State leads series, 2–0**

Chase Center
Attendance: 18,064
Referees: Roy Gulbeyan, Tiara Cruse, Angelica Suffren

==== Game 3 ====
NBCSN

October 9
9:30 PM ET

Recap

**Golden State Valkyries** **87**, Las Vegas Aces 77 (OT)
Scoring by quarter: 16-**19**, 20–**26**, **17**–7, 18–**19**, Overtime: **16**–6
Pts: Kayla Thornton 18; Rebs: Kiah Stokes 10; Asts: Burton, Hayes 4	Pts: A'ja Wilson 21; Rebs: A'ja Wilson 10; Asts: Chelsea Gray 5
**Golden State won series, 3–0**

Michelob Ultra Arena
Attendance: 10,218
Referees: Fatou Cissoko-Stephens, Kevin Fahy, Maj Forsberg

Regular-season series
TBD won 0–0 in the regular-season series

=== (4) Atlanta Dream vs. (8) New York Liberty ===
==== Game 1 ====
ABC

October 4
2 PM ET

Recap

New York Liberty 82, **Atlanta Dream** **92**
Scoring by quarter: **24**–21, 16–16, 15–**32**, **27**–23
Pts: Sabrina Ionescu 27; Rebs: Jonquel Jones 11; Asts: Jonquel Jones 4	Pts: Jordin Canada 25; Rebs: DeWanna Bonner 9 Asts: Rhyne Howard 8
**Atlanta leads series, 1–0**

State Farm Arena
Attendance: 9,745
Referees: Roy Gulbeyan, Ashley Gloss, Angel Kent

==== Game 2 ====
ESPN

October 7
7:30 PM ET

Recap

New York Liberty 98, **Atlanta Dream** **101**
Scoring by quarter: 26–26, 28–**30**, **20**–19, 10–**13**
Pts: Breanna Stewart 35; Rebs: Breanna Stewart 11; Asts: Sabrina Ionescu 7	Pts: Canada, Reese 23; Rebs: Naz Hillmon 8 Asts: Jordin Canada 8
**Atlanta leads series, 2–0**

State Farm Arena
Attendance: 9,574
Referees: Fatou Cissoko-Stephens, Kevin Fahy, Marcy Williams

==== Game 3 ====
ESPN2

October 9
7:30 PM ET

Recap

**Atlanta Dream** **85**, New York Liberty 83
Scoring by quarter: **25**–18, 19–**21**, 22–**29**, **19**–15
Pts: Angel Reese 22; Rebs: DeWanna Bonner 13; Asts: Jordin Canada 11	Pts: Jones, Stewart 26; Rebs: Jonquel Jones 14; Asts: Breanna Stewart 6
**Atlanta won series, 3–0**

Barclays Center
Attendance: 17,991
Referees: Tiara Cruse, Timothy Greene, Ryan Sassano

Regular-season series
TBD won 0–0 in the regular-season series

== WNBA Finals ==
=== (2) Golden State Valkyries vs. (4) Atlanta Dream ===
==== Game 1 ====
NBC

October 17
3:30 PM ET

Recap

Atlanta Dream 64, **Golden State Valkyries** **68**
Scoring by quarter: **22**–14, 17–**28**, **17**–9, 8–**17**
Pts: Allisha Gray 19; Rebs: Angel Reese 12; Asts: Jordin Canada 7	Pts: Gabby Williams 26; Rebs: Kaila Charles 10; Asts: Tiffany Hayes 4
**Golden State leads series, 1–0**

Chase Center
Attendance: 18,064
Referees: Randy Richardson, Ashley Gloss, Maj Forsberg

==== Game 2 ====
USA Network

October 19
8 PM ET

Recap

**Atlanta Dream** **79**, Golden State Valkyries 65
Scoring by quarter: 18–**21**, **21**–16, **21**–9, 19–19
Pts: Angel Reese 30; Rebs: Angel Reese 16; Asts: Jordin Canada 10	Pts: Hayes, Williams 14; Rebs: Kiah Stokes 11; Asts: Chen, Hayes 3
**Series tied, 1–1**

Chase Center
Attendance: 18,064
Referees: Tiara Cruse, Angel Kent, Kevin Fahy

==== Game 3 ====
USA Network

October 21
8 PM ET

Recap

Golden State Valkyries 71, **Atlanta Dream** **97**
Scoring by quarter: 15–**23**, **25**–23, 17–**25**, 14–**26**
Pts: Gabby Williams 15; Rebs: Kiah Stokes 11; Asts: Gabby Williams 8	Pts: Angel Reese 21; Rebs: Angel Reese 12; Asts: Jordin Canada 8
**Atlanta leads series, 2–1**

State Farm Arena
Attendance: 17,099
Referees: Fatou Cissoko-Stephens, Ryan Sassano, Amy Bonner

==== Game 4 ====
NBC

October 24
1 PM ET

Recap

**Golden State Valkyries** **67**, Atlanta Dream 62
Scoring by quarter: **16**–11, **26**–15, 12–**19**, 13–**17**
Pts: Gabby Williams 17; Rebs: Kiah Stokes 16; Asts: Veronica Burton 5	Pts: Rhyne Howard 19; Rebs: Hillmon, Reese 9 Asts: Jordin Canada 4
**Series tied, 2–2**

State Farm Arena
Attendance: 17,099
Referees: Roy Gulbeyan, Timothy Greene, Marcy Williams

==== Game 5 ====
USA Network

October 26
8 PM ET

Recap

Atlanta Dream 55, **Golden State Valkyries** **64**
Scoring by quarter: **14**–13, 8–**12**, 18–**21**, 15–**18**
Pts: Rhyne Howard 20; Rebs: Angel Reese 15; Asts: Canada, Reese 5	Pts: Burton, Stokes 13; Rebs: Burton, Stokes 8 Asts: Kaila Charles 4
**Golden State leads series, 3–2**

Chase Center
Attendance: 18,064
Referees: Tiara Cruse, Randy Richardson, Angel Kent

==== Game 6 ====
USA Network

October 29
12:30 PM ET

Recap

Golden State Valkyries 69, **Atlanta Dream** **80**
Scoring by quarter: 15–**32**, 11–**14**, **21**–17, **22**–17
Pts: Gabby Williams 26; Rebs: Laeticia Amihere 10; Asts: Veronica Burton 4	Pts: Allisha Gray 23; Rebs: Angel Reese 14; Asts: Angel Reese 6
**Series tied, 3–3**

State Farm Arena
Attendance: 17,099
Referees: Fatou Cissoko-Stephens, Ashley Gloss, Ryan Sassano

==== Game 7 ====
USA Network

October 31
8 PM ET

Recap

Atlanta Dream 63, **Golden State Valkyries** **68**
Scoring by quarter: 12–**14**, **18**—10, 14–**21**, 19–**23**
Pts: Jordin Canada 18; Rebs: Angel Reese 12; Asts: Jordin Canada 5	Pts: Gabby Williams 30; Rebs: Kiah Stokes 13; Asts: Veronica Burton 5
**Golden State won series, 4–3**

Chase Center
Attendance: 18,064
Referees: Roy Gulbeyan, Tiara Cruse, Timothy Greene

Regular-season series
TBD won 0–0 in the regular-season series
