= Shaanxi Red Wolves =

Shaanxi Tianze Red Wolves
- League: Women's Chinese Basketball Association
- Founded: 2017; 8 years ago
- Arena: Weinan Sports Centre
- Capacity: 3,500
- Location: Weinan, Shaanxi, China
- Main sponsor: Shaanxi Sports Lottery (since 2018)
- Affiliation(s): Tianze Group

The Shaanxi Tianze Red Wolves are a Chinese professional women's basketball club based in Weinan, Shaanxi, playing in the Women's Chinese Basketball Association (WCBA). The team is owned by the Tianze Group.

== Season-by-season records ==
Season	Corporate Sponsor	Final Rank	Record (including playoffs)			Head coach
Season	Corporate Sponsor	Final Rank	W	L	PCT	Head coach
2017–18	Xifeng Liquor	14th	3	23	11.5	Zhang Yongjun
2018–19	Shaanxi Sports Lottery	13th	11	23	32.4	Zhang Yongjun

== Current players ==
2018–19 Shaanxi Red Wolves roster
Players
Coaches

Pos.	No.	Nat.	Name	Ht.	Wt.
C	0	(United States)	A'ja Wilson	1.96 m (6 ft 5 in)	90 kg (198 lb)
SF	1	(China)	Shi Anting	1.77 m (5 ft 10 in)	67 kg (148 lb)
PG	2	(Chinese Taipei)	Lin Hsien-fang	1.72 m (5 ft 8 in)	64 kg (141 lb)
PF	3	(China)	Ma Xueru	1.92 m (6 ft 4 in)	68 kg (150 lb)
G	5	(China)	Gong Xiaorui	1.70 m (5 ft 7 in)	67 kg (148 lb)
SF	6	(China)	Jia Funing	1.81 m (5 ft 11 in)	65 kg (143 lb)
SF	7	(China)	Pei Yue	1.79 m (5 ft 10 in)	62 kg (137 lb)
G	8	(China)	Zhou Yueming	1.70 m (5 ft 7 in)	62 kg (137 lb)
C	9	(China)	Li Jinjun	1.85 m (6 ft 1 in)	74 kg (163 lb)
PF	10	(China)	Zhang Yuchen	1.83 m (6 ft 0 in)	86 kg (190 lb)
SF	12	(China)	Li Shanshan	1.76 m (5 ft 9 in)	63 kg (139 lb)
SG	13	(Chinese Taipei)	Liu Hsi-yeh	1.73 m (5 ft 8 in)	64 kg (141 lb)
SF	14	(China)	Cao Yinqi	1.85 m (6 ft 1 in)	75 kg (165 lb)
SF	15	(China)	Song Ning	1.80 m (5 ft 11 in)	70 kg (154 lb)
G	18	(China)	Gao Yang	1.67 m (5 ft 6 in)	64 kg (141 lb)
C	55	(United States)	Theresa Plaisance	1.96 m (6 ft 5 in)	91 kg (201 lb)

Head coach

- (China) Zhang Yongjun

Assistant coach(es)

- (China) Fan Qun

Legend

- (C) Team captain
- Injured

== Notable former players ==
- (United States) Morgan Tuck (2017–18)

== See also ==
- Shaanxi Wolves, the men's professional basketball team in Shaanxi
