= Marième Badiane =

French basketball player (born 1994)

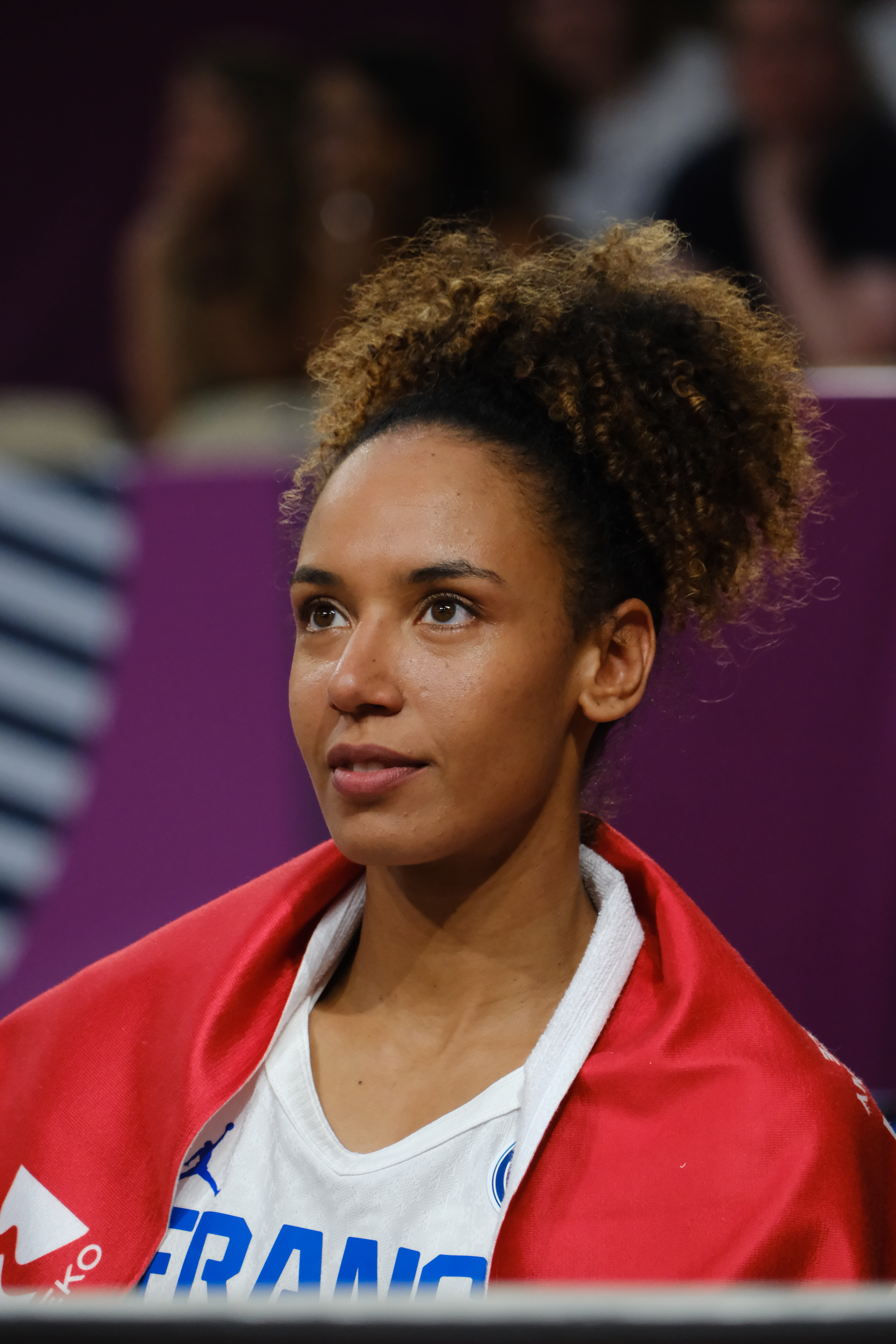
- Badiane with France in 2025

No. 25 – Beşiktaş
- Position: Center
- League: Turkish Super League; EuroLeague Women

Personal information
- Born: 24 November 1994 (age 31) Brest, France
- Listed height: 6 ft 4 in (1.93 m)
- Listed weight: 181 lb (82 kg)

Career information
- WNBA draft: 2016: undrafted

Career history
- 2009–2012: Centre fédéral
- 2012–2013: Roche Vendée
- 2013–2015: Champagne Basket Reims
- 2015–2017: Mondeville
- 2017–2022: ASVEL
- 2022–2024: BLMA
- 2024–2025: Fenerbahçe
- 2025: Minnesota Lynx
- 2025–2026: Beretta Famila Schio
- 2026–present: Beşiktaş

Career highlights
- EuroLeague champion (2024); Europe SuperCup champion (2024); Ligue Féminine Basket champion (2018–19); Basketball Super League champion (2023–24); Turkish Cup champion (2023–24); Turkish Presidential Cup champion (2024)
- Stats at Basketball Reference
Medals
Women's basketball
Representing France
Olympic Games
Silver medal – second place	2024 Paris	Team
FIBA World Cup
Silver medal – second place	2026 Germany
EuroBasket
Silver medal – second place	2019 Serbia/Latvia
Bronze medal – third place	2023 Israel/Slovenia

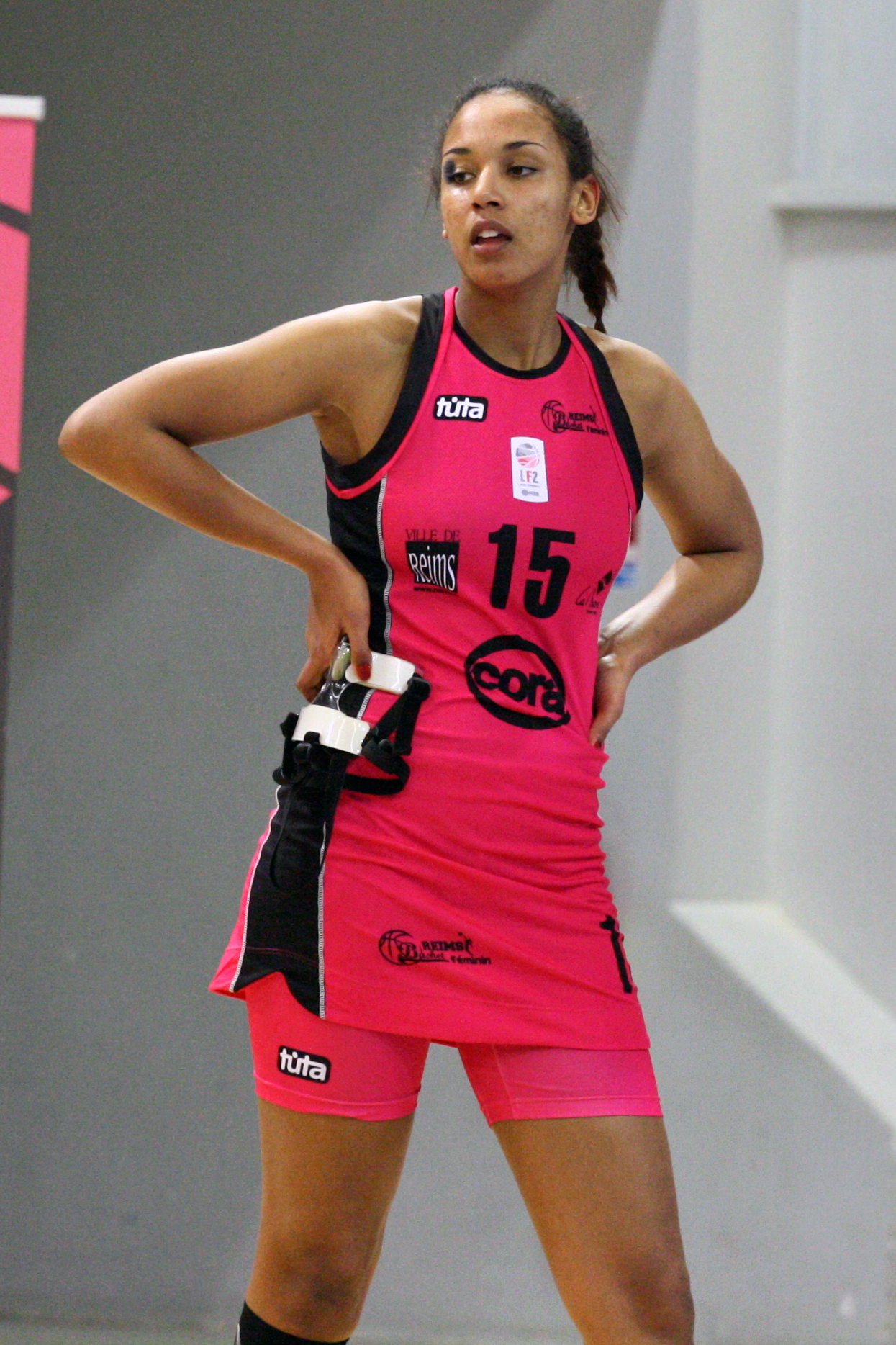
Badiane with ASVEL in 2021–22 season

Marième Badiane (born 24 November 1994) is a French professional basketball player for Beşiktaş of the Turkish Super League and EuroLeague Women. She also plays for the French national team.

== Early life ==
She is daughter of former basketball players Abdoulaye Badiane who played as shooting guard for Étendard de Brest between 1989-2000 and Cathy Silinski who played as center for Étoile Saint-Laurent Brest. She is of Senegalese descent through her father.

== Career ==
=== Club ===
She started her career with Centre fédéral where she spent three years and signed her first professional contract with Roche Vendée of Ligue 2. She said "Aix and Mondeville made great offers to me (...) but I chose the Ligue 2 option with Roche Vendée, to have more playing time and gain experience. I really like the sports project, and I can continue my studies in biology easily" then.

She only stayed there for a year and joined another Ligue 2 team, Champagne Basket Reims. Although courted during the summer by Belgian and LFB clubs, she chose to stay for another season in Champagne Basket Reims to complete her biology degree before starting an exclusively sporting career.

Following a good season in Champagne Basket Reims (12.1 pts and 8.1 rebounds on average), she signed in April (2015) in LFB for Mondeville.

At the end of 2016-2017 season, she was signing up for three seasons with ASVEL, a club recently taken over by Tony Parker. Then from November (2019), she renewed her commitment to ASVEL for the period of 2020-2023. She is skipping the 2020-2021 LFB season due to maternity.

She successfully returned to competition in 2022-2023 at BLMA and continued the following year (11.7 points and 6.4 rebounds in 9 matches and 14.8 points and 5.2 rebounds in the EuroCup Women).

In February 2024, she joined the Turkish powerhouse Fenerbahçe, managed by Valérie Garnier, to strengthen their squad in EuroLeague Women. She won the 2023–24 EuroLeague Women with the team.

On 1 February 2025, Badiane signed with the Minnesota Lynx of the Women's National Basketball Association (WNBA). On 4 June, she was waived by the Lynx after appearing in three of the Lynx first eight games.

=== International ===
She is part of French national team.

== Career statistics ==
Legend
GP	Games played	GS	Games started	MPG	Minutes per game	RPG	Rebounds per game
APG	Assists per game	SPG	Steals per game	BPG	Blocks per game	PPG	Points per game
TO	Turnovers per game	FG%	Field-goal percentage	3P%	3-point field-goal percentage	FT%	Free-throw percentage
**Bold**	Career best	°	League leader

=== WNBA ===
Stats current through 2025 season

WNBA regular season statistics
Year	Team	GP	GS	MPG	FG%	3P%	FT%	RPG	APG	SPG	BPG	TO	PPG
2025	Minnesota	3	0	3.7	.000	.000	—	0.3	0.0	0.7	0.0	0.7	0.0
**Career**	1 year, 1 team	3	0	3.7	.000	.000	—	0.3	0.0	0.7	0.0	0.7	0.0

== Honours ==
=== Club ===
- EuroLeague Women
  - Champion 2023–24
- FIBA Europe SuperCup Women
  - Champion 2024
- (France) Ligue Féminine Basket
  - Champion 2018–19
  - Runners-up 2021–22
- (France) **French Cup**
  - Runners-up 2019–20
- (France) **Match des Champions**
  - Champion 2019
- (Turkey) Turkish Basketball Super League
  - Champion 2023–24
- (Turkey) Turkish Cup
  - Champion 2023–24
- (Turkey) Turkish Super Cup
  - Champion 2024
- Triple Crown: 2024

=== International ===
- Olympics
  - Runners-up 2024
- EuroBasket
  - Runners-up 2019
  - Third place 2023
- (France) Francophone Games
  - Champion 2017

=== Orders ===
- Chevalier in the French Order of Merit: 2024
