= Robin Roberts =

Robin Roberts may refer to:

- Robin Roberts (newscaster) (born 1960), Good Morning America anchor and former ESPN anchor
- Robin Roberts (baseball) (1926–2010), American baseball player
- Rockin' Robin Roberts (1940–1967), American singer

== See also ==
- Robin Robertson (born 1955), Scottish poet
- Robert Roberts (disambiguation), multiple people
