= List of WNBA franchise post-season streaks =

This is a list of Women's National Basketball Association (WNBA) franchise post-season appearance streaks. This list includes the all-time and the active consecutive playoffs appearance. Aside from the WNBA Playoff appearance streaks, this list also includes the WNBA Finals appearance streak and the WNBA championships win streak.

== Active streaks ==
=== WNBA Playoffs appearance streaks ===
This is a list of teams that have active and current consecutive seasons with a playoff appearance.

List updated through October 31, 2026.

^	Longest streak in team history
~	Tied for longest streak in team history

2026 Playoff Teams
Streak	Team	WNBA Playoffs appearance streak	WNBA championships won during streak
8	Las Vegas Aces~	2019–2026	3 (2022, 2023, 2025)
6	New York Liberty^	2021–2026	1 (2024)
4	Atlanta Dream	2023–2026	—
4	Minnesota Lynx	2023–2026	—
3	Indiana Fever	2024–2026	—
2	Golden State Valkyries^	2025–2026	1 (2026)
1	Dallas Wings	2026	—
1	Washington Mystics	2026	—

=== WNBA Playoffs series win streaks ===
This is a list of teams that have active and current consecutive seasons with a playoff series win.

List updated through the 2026 playoffs.

^	Longest streak in team history
~	Tied for longest streak in team history

Consecutive seasons with a series win
Streak	Team	WNBA Playoffs series win streak	WNBA championships won during streak
5	Las Vegas Aces^	2022–2026	3 (2022, 2023, 2025)
1	New York Liberty	2026	—
1	Atlanta Dream	2026	—
1	Golden State Valkyries^	2026	1 (2026)

== All-time streaks ==
=== WNBA Playoffs appearance streaks ===
Appearance streaks updated through the 2026 playoffs.

^	Denotes active streak

Streak	Team	WNBA Playoffs appearance streak	WNBA championships won during streak
12	Indiana Fever	2005–2016	1 (2012)
11	Minnesota Lynx	2011–2021	4 (2011, 2013, 2015, 2017)
10	Seattle Storm	2004–2013	2 (2004, 2010)
10	Phoenix Mercury	2013–2022	1 (2014)
9	Los Angeles Sparks	2012–2020	1 (2016)
8	Los Angeles Sparks	1999–2006	2 (2001, 2002)
8	Connecticut Sun	2017–2024	—
8	Las Vegas Aces^	2019–2026	3 (2022, 2023, 2025)
7	Seattle Storm	2016–2022	2 (2018, 2020)
7	Detroit Shock	2003–2009	3 (2003, 2006, 2008)
7	Houston Comets	1997–2003	4 (1997, 1998, 1999, 2000)
6	Sacramento Monarchs	2003–2008	1 (2005)
6	Connecticut Sun	2003–2008	—
6	San Antonio Silver Stars	2007–2012	—
6	Atlanta Dream	2009–2014	—
6	New York Liberty^	2021–2026	1 (2024)
5	Chicago Sky	2019–2023	1 (2021)

=== WNBA Finals appearance streaks ===
Appearance streaks updated through 2026 WNBA playoffs.

^	Denotes active streak

Streak	Team	WNBA Finals appearance streak	WNBA championships won during streak
4	Houston Comets	1997–2000	4 (1997–2000)
3	Los Angeles Sparks	2001–2003	2 (2001, 2002)
3	Detroit Shock	2006–2008	2 (2006, 2008)
3	Minnesota Lynx	2011–2013	2 (2011, 2013)
3	Minnesota Lynx	2015–2017	2 (2015, 2017)
2	New York Liberty	1999–2000	—
2	Connecticut Sun	2004–2005	—
2	Sacramento Monarchs	2005–2006	1 (2005)
2	Atlanta Dream	2010–2011	—
2	Los Angeles Sparks	2016–2017	1 (2016)
2	Washington Mystics	2018–2019	1 (2019)
2	Las Vegas Aces	2022–2023	2 (2022, 2023)
2	New York Liberty	2023–2024	1 (2024)

=== WNBA championships win streaks ===
Championship streaks up to and including the 2026 WNBA playoffs

Streak	Team	WNBA championships win streak
4	Houston Comets	1997–2000
2	Los Angeles Sparks	2001–2002
2	Las Vegas Aces	2022–2023

== See also ==
- List of NBA franchise post-season streaks
- List of NFL franchise post-season streaks
- List of MLB franchise postseason streaks
