= FIBA Women's Olympics Most Valuable Player =

The FIBA Women's Summer Olympics Most Valuable Player is an award for the sport of basketball, that is given by FIBA, to the player that is voted the Most Valuable Player of the Summer Olympic Games women's basketball tournament.

== FIBA Women's Summer Olympics MVPs ==
	Denotes player whose team won that years tournament
*	Inducted into the Naismith Memorial Basketball Hall of Fame
**	Inducted into the FIBA Hall of Fame
***	Inducted into both the Naismith and FIBA Halls of Fame
	Denotes player who is still active
Player (X)	Denotes the number of times the player had been named MVP at that time
Team (X)	Denotes the number of times a player from this team had won at that time

Year	Player	Position	National Team	Ref.
2020	Breanna Stewart	PF	United States	
2024	A'ja Wilson	C	United States (2)	
