= Best WNBA Player ESPY Award =

Annual athletic award

- Awarded for: The best player in the Women's National Basketball Association (WNBA) in the preceding year
- Sponsored by: ESPN (ESPY Awards)
- Date: Annually
- Country: United States
- First award: 1998

The Best WNBA Player ESPY Award is an award given at the ESPY Awards show. It has been presented annually since 1998 to the Women's National Basketball Association (WNBA) player who has been voted the best in the preceding year. Beginning in 2003, the winner has been chosen by online voting, before that, determination of the winners was made by a panel of experts.

The inaugural winner was Cynthia Cooper, who would go on to win three consecutive awards. Candace Parker has won the award a record four times, while Lauren Jackson, Lisa Leslie, Diana Taurasi and A'ja Wilson have won the award three times. Only Cooper and Taurasi had their three wins in consecutive years. All winners other than Jackson, who is Australian, have been American. Winners have played all five of the standard basketball positions, the most honored position is power forward, players playing power forward have won eight awards. The award wasn't awarded in 2020 due to the COVID-19 pandemic.

== List of winners ==
Player was a member of the winning team in the WNBA Finals
Player was a member of the losing team in the WNBA Finals
† WNBA Finals MVP

Year	Player	Nationality	Position played	Team represented	Ref
1998	Cynthia Cooper^{†}	United States	Point guard	Houston Comets	
1999	Cynthia Cooper (2)^{†}	United States	Point guard	Houston Comets	
2000	Cynthia Cooper (3)^{†}	United States	Point guard	Houston Comets	
2001	Sheryl Swoopes	United States	Small forward	Houston Comets	
2002	Lisa Leslie^{†}	United States	Center	Los Angeles Sparks	
2003	Lisa Leslie (2)^{†}	United States	Center	Los Angeles Sparks	
2004	Lauren Jackson	Australia	Power forward	Seattle Storm	
2005	Lauren Jackson (2)	Australia	Power forward	Seattle Storm	
2006	Sheryl Swoopes (2)	United States	Small forward	Houston Comets	
2007	Lisa Leslie (3)	United States	Center	Los Angeles Sparks	
2008	Lauren Jackson (3)	Australia	Power forward	Seattle Storm	
2009	Candace Parker	United States	Power forward	Los Angeles Sparks	
2010	Diana Taurasi^{†}	United States	Shooting guard	Phoenix Mercury	
2011	Diana Taurasi (2)	United States	Shooting guard	Phoenix Mercury	
2012	Diana Taurasi (3)	United States	Shooting guard	Phoenix Mercury	
2013	Candace Parker (2)	United States	Power forward	Los Angeles Sparks	
2014	Maya Moore	United States	Small forward	Minnesota Lynx^{†}	
2015	Skylar Diggins	United States	Point guard	Tulsa Shock	
2016	Maya Moore (2)	United States	Small forward	Minnesota Lynx	
2017	Candace Parker (3)^{†}	United States	Power forward	Los Angeles Sparks	
2018	Maya Moore (3)	United States	Small forward	Minnesota Lynx	
2019	Breanna Stewart	United States	Power forward	Seattle Storm	
2020	Not awarded due to the COVID-19 pandemic				
2021	Breanna Stewart (2)	United States	Power forward	Seattle Storm	
2022	Candace Parker (4)	United States	Power forward	Chicago Sky	
2023	A'ja Wilson	United States	Power forward	Las Vegas Aces	
2024	A'ja Wilson (2)	United States	Power forward	Las Vegas Aces	
2025	Caitlin Clark	United States	Point guard	Indiana Fever	
2026	A'ja Wilson (3) ^{†}	United States	Power forward	Las Vegas Aces	

== See also ==
- List of sports awards honoring women
- WNBA awards
- WNBA Most Valuable Player
- Best NBA Player ESPY Award
