= Kasib Powell =

American basketball player & coach (born 1981)

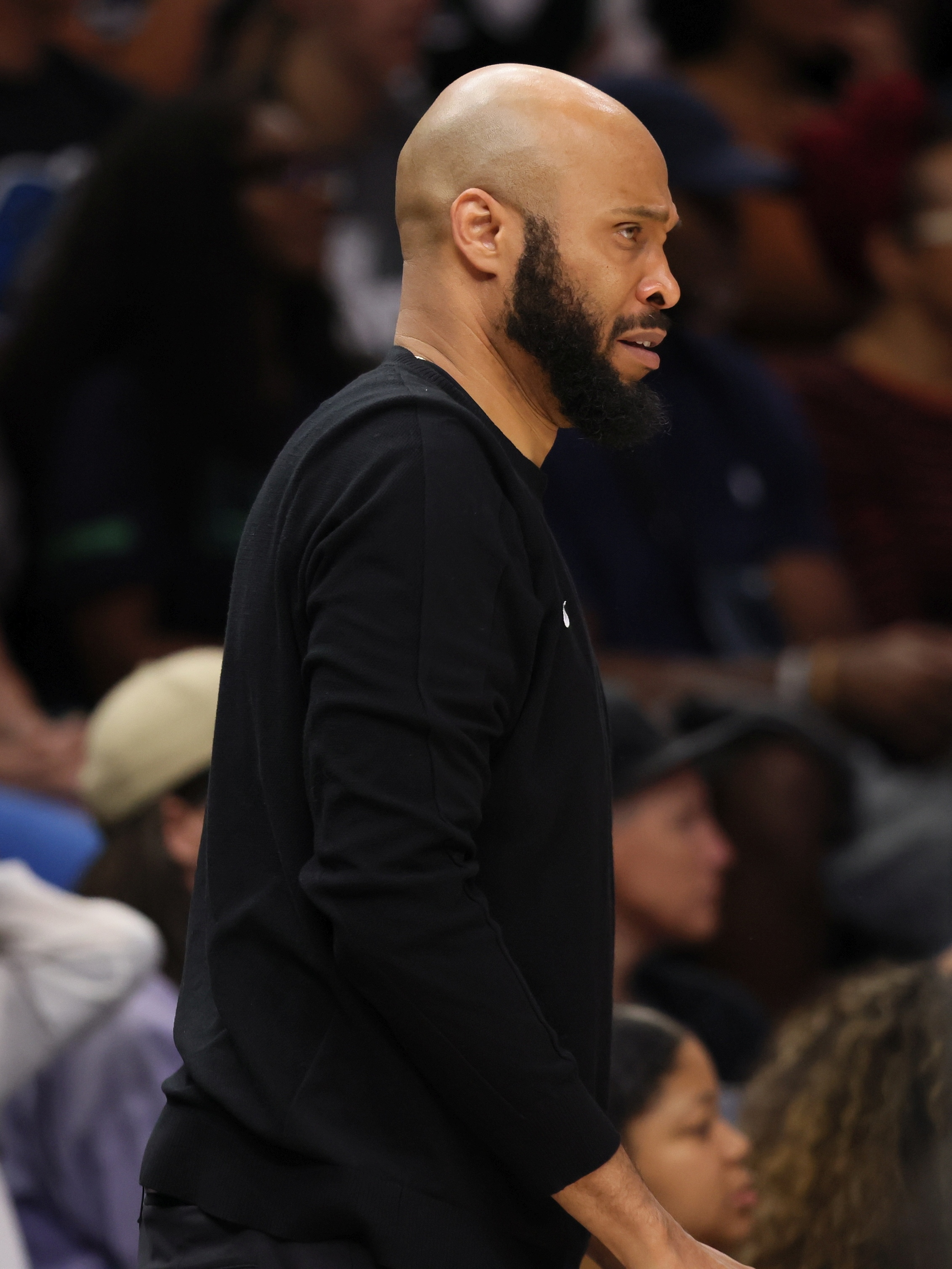
- Powell with the Golden State Valkyries in 2026

Golden State Valkyries
- Title: Assistant coach
- League: WNBA

Personal information
- Born: March 18, 1981 (age 45) Teaneck, New Jersey, U.S.
- Listed height: 6 ft 7 in (2.01 m)
- Listed weight: 220 lb (100 kg)

Career information
- High school: Teaneck (Teaneck, New Jersey)
- College: Butler CC (1999–2001); Texas Tech (2001–2003)
- NBA draft: 2003: undrafted
- Playing career: 2003–2012
- Position: Small forward
- Number: 12
- Coaching career: 2016–present

Career history

Playing
- 2003: Reflex Železnik
- 2003–2004: PAOK Thessaloniki
- 2004–2005: Great Lakes Storm
- 2005: New Jersey Flyers
- 2005–2006: Dakota Wizards
- 2006: Bosna
- 2006–2007: Spartak Saint Petersburg
- 2007–2008: Sioux Falls Skyforce
- 2008: Miami Heat
- 2008: Zhejiang Guangsha
- 2009: Sioux Falls Skyforce
- 2009–2010: Trikala 2000
- 2010–2011: Hapoel Holon
- 2011–2012: Fortress Körmend

Coaching
- 2016–2021: Sioux Falls Skyforce (assistant)
- 2021–2024: Sioux Falls Skyforce
- 2024: Miami Heat (assistant)
- 2025–present: Golden State Valkyries (assistant)

Career highlights
- As player: Greek All-Star Game Slam Dunk champion (2004); NBA D-League Most Valuable Player (2008); All-NBA D-League First Team (2008); 2× CBA All-Star (2005, 2006); All-CBA First Team (2006); As assistant coach: WNBA champion (2026)
- Stats at NBA.com
- Stats at Basketball Reference

Kasib Ismir Powell (born March 18, 1981) is an American professional basketball coach and former player currently working as an assistant coach for the Golden State Valkyries in the Women's National Basketball Association (WNBA). Powell was born and raised in Teaneck, New Jersey, where he played basketball at Teaneck High School. He played collegiately at Butler Community College and Texas Tech University. He also enjoyed a brief career in the NBA with the Miami Heat.

== Professional career ==
Powell has played professionally in the Adriatic League, the Greek League, the Continental Basketball Association (CBA), the USBL, the Russian Superleague, the NBA D-League, the NBA, the Bosnian League, the Chinese Basketball Association and the Israeli Basketball Super League. He played for the Dakota Wizards of the CBA during the 2005–06 season and earned All-CBA First Team honors. He averaged 22.2 points, 6.0 rebounds and 3.0 assists per game with the Sioux Falls Skyforce in the NBA D-League during the 2007–08 season and was named the league's MVP. He has also played in a number of preseason games for the Minnesota Timberwolves (2004), the Chicago Bulls (2005), the Orlando Magic (2006) and the Memphis Grizzlies (2007), but he failed to make any of the teams for the NBA regular season.

Because of a depleted roster due to various injuries, the Miami Heat signed Powell to a ten-day contract in March 2008. He got his first NBA career start on March 27, 2008. On April 3, the Heat decided against signing him to a second ten-day contract, however, he was re-signed by the Heat five days later for the remainder of the season.

In 2009, Powell signed with Trikala 2000.

In October 2010, Powell signed with Hapoel Holon in Israel.

In October 2011, Powell signed with Fortress Körmend, a Hungarian basketball team.

== Coaching career ==
On October 9, 2016, Powell was named assistant coach for the Sioux Falls Skyforce of the NBA Development League. On September 16, 2021, he was promoted to head coach.

On July 16, 2024, Powell became a player development coach for the Miami Heat.

On March 27, 2025, Powell was announced as an assistant coach for the Golden State Valkyries.

== NBA career statistics ==
Legend
GP	Games played	GS	Games started	MPG	Minutes per game
FG%	Field goal percentage	3P%	3-point field goal percentage	FT%	Free throw percentage
RPG	Rebounds per game	APG	Assists per game	SPG	Steals per game
BPG	Blocks per game	PPG	Points per game	**Bold**	Career high

=== Regular season ===
Year	Team	GP	GS	MPG	FG%	3P%	FT%	RPG	APG	SPG	BPG	PPG
2007–08	Miami	11	4	27.6	.368	.242	.667	4.0	1.6	.8	.2	7.6
