= Golden State Valkyries =

Women's National Basketball Association team in San Francisco, California

- 2026 Golden State Valkyries season
- Nickname: GSV; Valks
- Conference: Western
- League: WNBA
- Founded: 2025
- History: Golden State Valkyries; 2025–present
- Arena: Chase Center
- Location: San Francisco, California
- Team colors: Violet, black, gold, white
- President: Jess Smith
- General manager: Ohemaa Nyanin
- Head coach: Natalie Nakase
- Assistants: Kasib Powell; Sugar Rodgers; Landon Tatum
- Ownership: Joe Lacob; Peter Guber
- Championships: 1 (2026)
- Website: https://valkyries.com/

The Golden State Valkyries are an American professional basketball team based in the San Francisco Bay Area. The Valkyries compete in the Women's National Basketball Association (WNBA) as a member of the Western Conference. The team began play in the 2025 season. While the Valkyries play their home games at Chase Center (nicknamed "Ballhalla" during Valkyries home games) in San Francisco, their practice facility and front office are located in Oakland. The Valkyries won their first WNBA Finals in 2026 in only their second season of existence.

== History ==
The Women's National Basketball Association (WNBA), which started in 1997, previously had a team in northern California, the Sacramento Monarchs, which played from 1997 until folding in 2009, despite winning a league championship in 2005. After the Monarchs folded, the WNBA remained steady with 12 teams, although there was often talk of expanding the league.

Head Coach Natalie Nakase waves to crowd at Golden State Valkyries Championship Parade.

On September 26, 2023, The Athletic reported that the owners of the NBA's Golden State Warriors, Joe Lacob and Peter Guber, were finalizing an agreement to start a WNBA expansion team in San Francisco. Lacob had previously helped found the American Basketball League (ABL), which played before the WNBA, and owned one of their teams, the San Jose Lasers, until the ABL folded in 1998.

On October 5, 2023, the expansion team was officially announced, with plans to begin play in 2025, as the first expansion team in the WNBA since the Atlanta Dream in 2008. The expansion fee for the franchise was reported to be $50 million over 10 years. It was reported that the team's name would include "Golden State", with announcement of the name, logos, and uniforms to come at a later date.

Within the first few hours of being announced, over 2,000 season ticket deposits were placed. On January 30, 2024, Jess Smith, an executive with Angel City FC of the NWSL, was hired as the team's president. On April 16, the team surpassed 6,000 season ticket deposits. Ohemaa Nyanin was announced as general manager on May 7. A WNBA expansion draft occurred in early December 2024, and Golden State participated in its first WNBA draft in April 2025.

The team name – Golden State Valkyries – and logos were revealed on May 14, 2024. The logo features the Bay Bridge, symbolizing the connection between San Francisco and Oakland with the cables doubling as wings and the tower doubling as a sword. The thirteen lines from the sword represent the Valkyries as the thirteenth team in the league, and the wings split the space into five triangles to represent the ten players on the court. The outer shape is a V to represent the Valkyries.

The team mascot, Violet the raven, was revealed on August 11, 2025, at Chase Center at halftime.

=== Debut and first championship (2025–present) ===
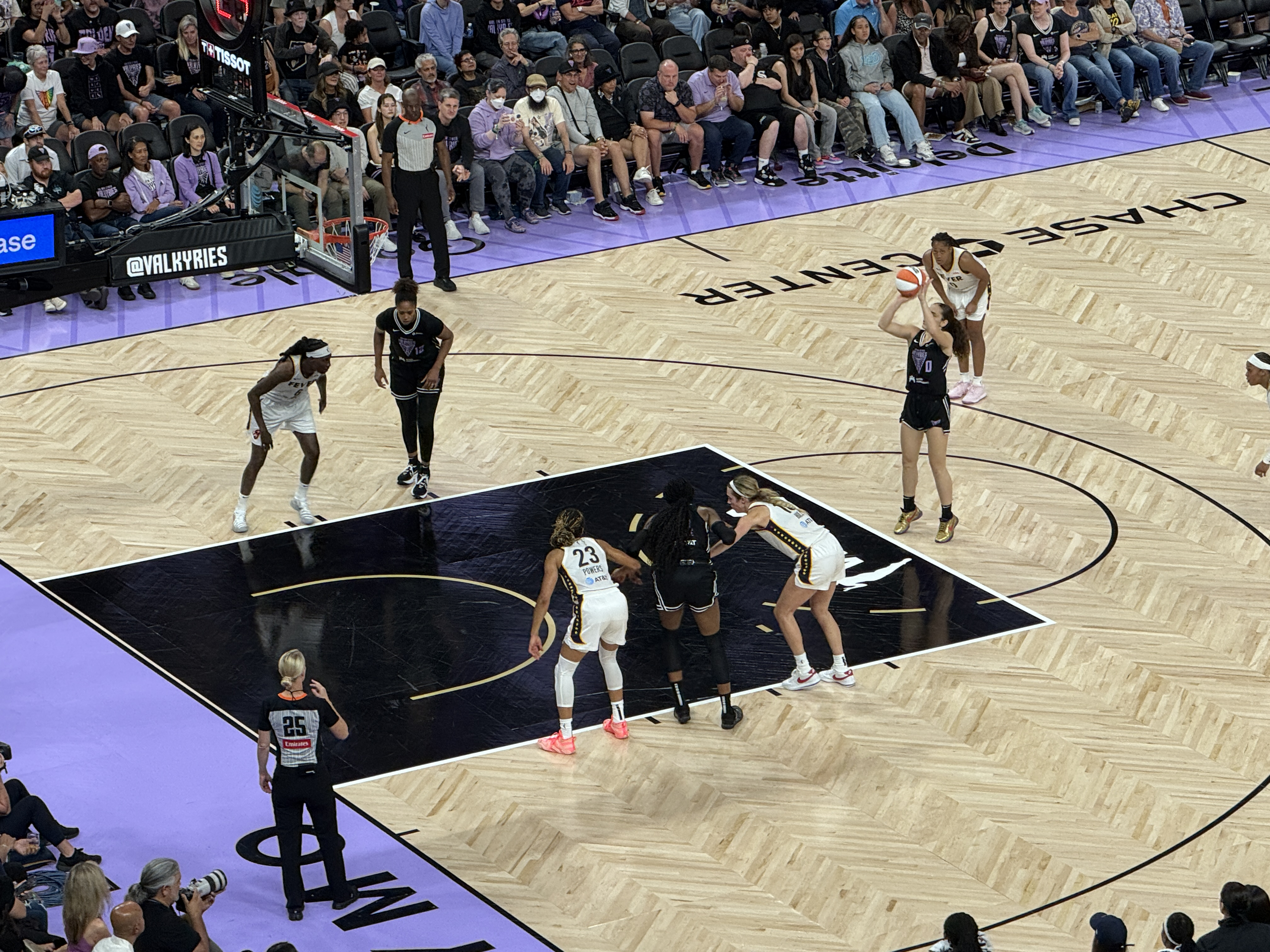
Valkyrie Carla Leite (#0) shoots a free throw during a game against the Indiana Fever at Chase Center in San Francisco, California, in August 2025.

The Golden State Valkyries made its WNBA debut on May 16, 2025, with an 84–76 loss to the Los Angeles Sparks, but the team secured its first regular season win just five days later on May 21, defeating the Washington Mystics 76–74. In August, Golden State set a WNBA record for most wins by an expansion team in its inaugural season with 18 victories—surpassing the 1998 Detroit Shock. The Valkyries became the first expansion franchise to reach the WNBA playoffs in its inaugural season and sold out all 22 home games at Chase Center, setting records in both total (397,408) and average (18,604) attendance for the regular season.

Golden State concluded the regular season with a 23–21 record, earning the eighth seed and a first-round matchup against the top-seeded Minnesota Lynx. In Game 1, the Valkyries opened with a double-digit lead but ultimately fell 101–72 after the Lynx took control in the second quarter. Their season ended in Game 2 with a narrow 75–74 loss, as Minnesota overcame a 17-point deficit and Cecilia Zandalasini missed a buzzer-beater that would have forced a Game 3. The Valkyries were recognized across the league for their performance: head coach Natalie Nakase was named the WNBA Coach of the Year with 53 of 72 votes; Veronica Burton was named the WNBA Most Improved Player; Janelle Salaün was selected to the WNBA All-Rookie Team; Jess Smith received the inaugural Business Executive Leadership Award; and Tiffany Hayes earned the WNBA Cares Community Assist Award.

In April 2026, the Valkyries signed former Storm player Gabby Williams on a multi-year contract. The Valkyries ended the 2026 season as the 2nd seed winning 32 games and qualifying for the playoffs. They entered the first round playing against the 7th seed Dallas Wings. They beat the Wings in 3 games, advancing to the second round playing against the defending champion Las Vegas Aces. By sweeping the defending champions Aces in the semifinal, the Valkyries qualified for their first WNBA Finals. They won their first WNBA title on October 31, 2026, by defeating the Atlanta Dream in Game 7 of the WNBA Finals, the first time the league championship was decided in the seventh game.

== Media coverage ==
Non-nationally televised games air on either KPIX-TV or KPYX, while nationally televised games air on either ABC (KGO-TV), ESPN, ESPN2, CBS (KPIX-TV), Ion (KKPX-TV), Amazon Prime Video, NBA TV, NBC (KNTV), NBCSN, and USA.

== Season-by-season records ==
Golden State Valkyries season-by-season record
Season	Team	Conference		Regular season			Playoff results	Head coach
Season	Team	Conference		W	L	PCT	Playoff results	Head coach
Golden State Valkyries
2025	2025	West	4th	23	21	.523	Lost First Round (Minnesota, 0–2)	Natalie Nakase
2026	2026	West	2nd	32	12	.727	Won First Round (Dallas, 2–1); Won Semifinals (Las Vegas, 3–0); Won Finals (Atlanta, 4–3)	Natalie Nakase
Regular season				55	33	.625	1 WNBA Championship	
Playoffs				9	6	.600	1 WNBA Championship	

== Players ==
=== Current roster ===
Golden State Valkyries roster
Players
Coaches

Pos.	No.	Nat.	Name	Height	Weight	DOB	From	Yrs
F	3	(Canada)	Amihere, Laeticia	6' 3" (1.91m)	185 lb (84kg)	2001-07-10	South Carolina	3
G	22	(United States)	Burton, Veronica	5' 9" (1.75m)	155 lb (70kg)	2000-07-12	Northwestern	4
G/F	6	(United States)	Charles, Kaila	6' 1" (1.85m)	168 lb (76kg)	1998-03-23	Maryland	5
G	2	(United States)	Chen, Kaitlyn	5' 9" (1.75m)		2002-02-22	Connecticut	1
C	31	(France)	Gueye, Aminata	6' 4" (1.93m)		2004-07-10	France	R
G	15	(Azerbaijan)	Hayes, Tiffany	5' 10" (1.78m)	155 lb (70kg)	1989-09-20	Connecticut	13
G/F	4	(Lithuania)	Jocytė, Justė	6' 2" (1.88m)		2005-11-19	Lithuania	R
F	11	(United States)	Prechtel, Ashten	6' 5" (1.96m)		2001-05-11	Stanford	R
C	12	(France)	Rupert, Iliana	6' 4" (1.93m)	189 lb (86kg)	2001-07-12	France	2
F	13	(France)	Salaün, Janelle	6' 2" (1.88m)		2001-09-05	France	1
G	7	(Australia)	Sowah, Miela	5' 10" (1.78m)	148 lb (67kg)	2000-06-04	Duke	R
C	41	(United States)	Stokes, Kiah	6' 3" (1.91m)	191 lb (87kg)	1993-03-30	Connecticut	10
F	5	(United States)	Thornton, Kayla	6' 1" (1.85m)	190 lb (86kg)	1992-10-20	UTEP	10
F	1	(France)	Williams, Gabby	5' 11" (1.8m)	172 lb (78kg)	1996-09-09	Connecticut	8
F	24	(Italy)	Zandalasini, Cecilia	6' 2" (1.88m)	175 lb (79kg)	1996-03-16	Italy	4

Head coach
(United States) Natalie Nakase (UCLA)
Assistant coaches
(United States) Kasib Powell (Texas Tech)
(United States) Sugar Rodgers (Georgetown)
(United States) Landon Tatum (Idaho)
Athletic trainer
(United States) Katelin Knox

Legend

- (C) Team captain
- (DP) Unsigned draft pick
- (FA) Free agent
- (S) Suspended
- Injured

WNBA roster page

East
ATL
CHI
CON
IND
NY
TOR
WAS
West
DAL
GS
LV
LA
MIN
PHO
POR
SEA

== Coaches and staff ==
=== Head coaches ===
On October 10, 2024, Natalie Nakase was hired by the Valkyries to be their first head coach.

Golden State Valkyries head coaches
Name	Start	End	Seasons	Regular season				Playoffs			
Name	Start	End	Seasons	W	L	PCT	G	W	L	PCT	G
Natalie Nakase	October 10, 2024	Current	2	55	33	.625	88	9	6	.600	15

=== General managers ===
- Ohemaa Nyanin (2024–present)

=== Assistant coaches ===
- Kasib Powell (2025–present)
- Sugar Rodgers (2025–present)
- Landon Tatum (2025–present)

== Statistics ==
Golden State Valkyries statistics
2020s

Season	Individual			Team vs Opponents		
Season	PPG	RPG	APG	PPG	RPG	FG%
2025	K. Thornton (14.0)	K. Thornton (7.0)	V. Burton (6.0)	77.7 vs 76.3	35.3 vs 33.3	.407 vs .405
2026	G. Williams (14.4)	K. Stokes (5.8)	V. Burton (5.7)	82.2 vs 75.1	33.3 vs 32.7	.422 vs .414

== All-time notes ==
=== Regular season attendance ===
- A sellout for a basketball game at Chase Center (2025–present) is 18,064.

Regular season all-time attendance
Year	Average	High	Low	Sellouts	Total for year	WNBA game average
2025	18,064 (1st)	18,064	18,064	22	397,408	10,986

=== Draft picks ===
- 2024 Expansion Draft: Iliana Rupert, María Conde, Veronica Burton, Carla Leite, Temi Fágbénlé, Kate Martin, Stephanie Talbot, Cecilia Zandalasini, Kayla Thornton, Monique Billings, Julie Vanloo
- 2025: Justė Jocytė (5), Shyanne Sellers (17), Kaitlyn Chen (30)
- 2026: Flau'jae Johnson (8), Ashlon Jackson (28), Kokoro Tanaka (38)

=== All-Stars ===
- 2025: Kayla Thornton
- 2026: Gabby Williams

=== Honors and awards ===
- 2025 Most Improved Player: Veronica Burton
- 2025 All-Rookie Team: Janelle Salaün
- 2025 All-Defensive Second Team: Veronica Burton
- 2025 Coach of the Year: Natalie Nakase
- 2025 Business Executive Leadership Award: Jess Smith
- 2025 Cares Community Assist Award: Tiffany Hayes
- 2026 Sixth Player of the Year: Janelle Salaün
- 2026 WNBA Finals MVP: Gabby Williams
