= 2025 WNBA season =

- League: Women's National Basketball Association
- Sport: Basketball
- Duration: May 16 – October 10, 2025
- Games: 44 per team
- Teams: 13
- Total attendance: 3,142,082
- Average attendance: 10,986
- TV partner(s): ABC/ESPN/ESPN2; Ion; CBS/CBSSN; Amazon Prime Video; NBA TV

Draft
- Top draft pick: (United States) Paige Bueckers
- Picked by: Dallas Wings

Regular season
- Top seed: Minnesota Lynx
- Season MVP: (United States) A'ja Wilson (Las Vegas)
- Top scorer: (United States) A'ja Wilson (Las Vegas)

Playoffs
- Finals champions: Las Vegas Aces (third title)
- Runners-up: Phoenix Mercury
- Finals MVP: (United States) A'ja Wilson (Las Vegas)

WNBA seasons
- ← 2024 2026 →

The 2025 WNBA season was the 29th season of the Women's National Basketball Association (WNBA). The regular season began on May 16, 2025 and ended on September 11. The fifth edition of the WNBA Commissioner's Cup was held from June 1 to July 1. The 2025 WNBA All-Star Game was held on July 19, 2025, at Gainbridge Fieldhouse in Indianapolis. The playoffs began on September 14th and the WNBA Finals between the Las Vegas Aces and Phoenix Mercury began on October 3, with the Aces winning the championship on October 10, for their third WNBA title. For the first time, the Finals used a best-of-seven format.

In August 2024, the WNBA announced that the Indiana Fever would host the 2025 WNBA All-Star Game and related events in July 2025 for the first time in franchise history. Tickets for All-Star weekend events went on sale on April 29, 2025, and sold out within seven hours.

The league expanded from 12 to 13 teams with the addition of the Golden State Valkyries, who were first announced in 2023. The Valkyries were the league's first expansion team since the Atlanta Dream in 2008.

For the first time in league history, all 15 preseason games were televised nationally or streamed online via League Pass.

== "No Space for Hate" platform ==
Ahead of the start of the 2025 season, the WNBA announced the launch of their new task force called "No Space for Hate," "designed to combat hate and promote respect across all WNBA spaces—from online discourse to in-arena behavior." The platform will utilize AI-powered technology to monitor social media in relation to players and their teams as well as increase security measures and access to mental health resources across the league.

On May 18, 2025, the WNBA announced they had opened an investigation regarding, "allegations of inappropriate fan conduct" directed at Chicago Sky players occurring during the Indiana Fever's May 17 home opener versus the Sky. The Sky's head coach, Tyler Marsh, told the press that he and his team did not report or witness any misconduct while at Gainbridge Fieldhouse and only learned about the allegations after the game had concluded. Nine days later, the WNBA announced their investigation was complete, and all allegations of racist fan behavior were unsubstantiated.

On June 1, 2025, during the Seattle Storm home game against the Las Vegas Aces, a complaint was filed by the Aces with an allegation of a Storm assistant coach cursing at an Aces player. On June 4, the Storm's general manager, Talisa Rhea, stated to the press that the WNBA would not be launching an investigation, but rather would be "looking into it and that's really the extent of it."

== Drafts ==
=== 2024 WNBA expansion draft ===
The 2024 WNBA expansion draft was held on December 6, 2024, to fill the roster of the expansion Golden State Valkyries. The Valkyries picked one player from each of the twelve existing teams except for the Seattle Storm.

=== 2025 WNBA draft ===
The 2025 WNBA draft was held on Monday, April 14, 2025.

==== Lottery picks ====
Pick	Player	Nationality	Team	School / club team	Ref.
1	Paige Bueckers	United States	Dallas Wings	Connecticut	
2	Dominique Malonga	France	Seattle Storm (from Los Angeles)	ASVEL Féminin	
3	Sonia Citron	United States	Washington Mystics (from Chicago)	Notre Dame	
4	Kiki Iriafen	United States	Washington Mystics	USC	

== Transactions ==
=== Retirement ===
- On September 20, 2024, Layshia Clarendon announced their retirement after twelve seasons in the WNBA. Clarendon was the first openly non-binary WNBA player, and the first active WNBA player to have top surgery. Clarendon played for six teams during their career and was selected as an All-Star in 2017. Clarendon played for the Indiana Fever, Atlanta Dream, Connecticut Sun, New York Liberty, Minnesota Lynx, and Los Angeles Sparks.
- On January 1, 2025, Danielle Robinson announced her retirement after twelve seasons in the WNBA. Robinson was selected to the All-Rookie team in 2011, and was the league's assist leader in 2013. Robinson also was selected to the All-WNBA Second team in 2014 and the All-Defensive Team three times during her career. She was selected as an All-Star three times. She most recently played for the Indiana Fever
- On February 25, 2025, Diana Taurasi announced her retirement after 20 seasons in the WNBA. Taurasi spent all 20 seasons with the Phoenix Mercury, where she won three WNBA Championships, two Finals MVP awards, and one regular season MVP. She was an 11-time All-Star, was selected 10 times to the All-WNBA First team, and she was selected to the All-WNBA Second team four times. She won the Rookie of the Year Award in her rookie season, 2004. She led the league in scoring five times and retired as the all-time scoring leader, free throw leader, and leader in career 3-point field goals. Taurasi was also named to the three most recent WNBA anniversary teams—the Top 15 (2011), Top 20 (2016), and The W25 (2021).
- On April 4, 2025, Elena Delle Donne announced her retirement after 10 seasons in the WNBA. Delle Donne played for both the Sky and Mystics, where she won one WNBA Championship with the Mystics. She won two regular season MVPs, one with each team. She was a seven-time All-Star, was selected four times to the All-WNBA First team, and she was selected to the All-WNBA Second team once. She won the Rookie of the Year Award in her rookie season, 2013. She led the league in scoring in 2015 and is the only WNBA player to join the 50–40–90 club. Delle Donne was also named to The W25 in 2021.
- On June 10, 2025, Allie Quigley announced her retirement from professional basketball after fourteen seasons in the WNBA. Quigley spent ten of those season with the Chicago Sky where she won the WNBA Championship in 2021. She was a three-time All-Star, and two-time Sixth Woman of the Year.

=== Free agency ===
From January 11–20, 2025, teams were able to extend qualifying offers to core-eligible or reserved players.

The free agency negotiation period began on January 21, 2025, and teams were able to officially begin signing players on February 1, 2025.

The mid-season cut-down date for the 2025 season was July 13, the final date teams could have waived players on unprotected contracts without financial penalty.

=== Coaching changes ===
Off-season
Team	2024 season	2025 season	Ref.
Atlanta Dream	(United States) Tanisha Wright	(United States) Karl Smesko	
Chicago Sky	(United States) Teresa Weatherspoon	(United States) Tyler Marsh	
Connecticut Sun	(United States) Stephanie White	(France) Rachid Meziane	
Dallas Wings	(United States) Latricia Trammell	(United States) Chris Koclanes	
Golden State Valkyries	Did not exist	(United States) Natalie Nakase	
Indiana Fever	(United States) Christie Sides	(United States) Stephanie White	
Los Angeles Sparks	(United States) Curt Miller	(United States) Lynne Roberts	
Washington Mystics	(United States) Eric Thibault	(United States) Sydney Johnson	

== Preseason ==
The May 4 exhibition game, featuring the Indiana Fever and Brazil's national team, was the third most viewed preseason basketball game on ESPN (in both NBA and WNBA history) since 2010 with an average 1.3 million viewers.

=== Schedule ===
2025 WNBA preseason
Preseason

Date	Time (ET)	Matchup			TV	Result	High points	High rebounds	High assists	Location
Monday, April 14	7:30 p.m.	2025 WNBA draft			USA: ESPN; Canada: TSN1/3/4/5, SN360/SNP	—				The Shed
Friday, May 2	7:00 p.m.	Dallas	@	Las Vegas	ION; League Pass	78–112	Young (28)	Bradford (8)	Young (9)	Purcell Pavilion; 7,602
Friday, May 2	9:00 p.m.	Brazil	@	Chicago	ION; League Pass	62–89	Reese (15)	Reese (10)	Tied (5)	Pete Maravich Assembly Center; 6,373
Saturday, May 3	1:00 p.m.	Washington	@	Indiana	USA: NBA TV; League Pass; Canada: NBA TV Canada	74–79 (OT)	Cunningham (21)	Tied (8)	Sutton (5)	Gainbridge Fieldhouse; 12,461
Sunday, May 4	4:00 p.m.	Brazil	@	Indiana	USA: ESPN; Canada: TSN2	44–108	Mitchell (17)	Martins (8)	Tied (5)	Carver-Hawkeye Arena; 14,998
Sunday, May 4	6:00 p.m.	Connecticut	@	Seattle	League Pass	59–79	Ogwumike (18)	Li (10)	Brown (5)	Climate Pledge Arena; 7,153
Tuesday, May 6	7:00 p.m.	Minnesota	@	Chicago	League Pass	69–74	Vandersloot (11)	Smith (9)	Tied (5)	Wintrust Arena; 4,688
Tuesday, May 6	10:00 p.m.	Los Angeles	@	Golden State	League Pass	83–82	Amihere (20)	Stevens (11)	Hamby (6)	Chase Center; 17,428
Tuesday, May 6	10:00 p.m.	Phoenix	@	Las Vegas	League Pass	84–85	Kelly (15)	Heal (7)	Gray (6)	Michelob Ultra Arena; 8,637
Wednesday, May 7	11:30 a.m.	Atlanta	@	Washington	League Pass	80–70	Griner (16)	Griner (10)	Tied (4)	CareFirst Arena; 4,200
Friday, May 9	7:00 p.m.	Connecticut	@	New York	League Pass	94–86	Charles (17)	Nelson-Ododa (7)	Allen (7)	Barclays Center; 8,395
Saturday, May 10	3:00 p.m.	Indiana	@	Atlanta	League Pass	81–76	Tied (14)	Turner (8)	Clark (7)	Gateway Center Arena; 3,265
Saturday, May 10	8:00 p.m.	(Japan) Toyota; Antelopes	@	Dallas	League Pass	52–119	Bueckers (15)	N. Smith (7)	Tied (6)	College Park Center; 6,251
Saturday, May 10	8:00 p.m.	Chicago	@	Minnesota	League Pass	87–92	Collier (26)	Shepard (9)	Shepard (9)	Target Center; 7,615
Sunday, May 11	6:00 p.m.	Golden State	@	Phoenix	League Pass	84–79	Touré (19)	Whitcomb (8)	Tied (6)	PHX Arena; 6,430
Monday, May 12	10:00 p.m.	(Japan) Toyota; Antelopes	@	New York	League Pass	61–84	Ionescu (25)	Amaka Okonkwo (8)	Onodera (10)	Matthew Knight Arena; 12,364

== Regular season ==
=== Standings ===
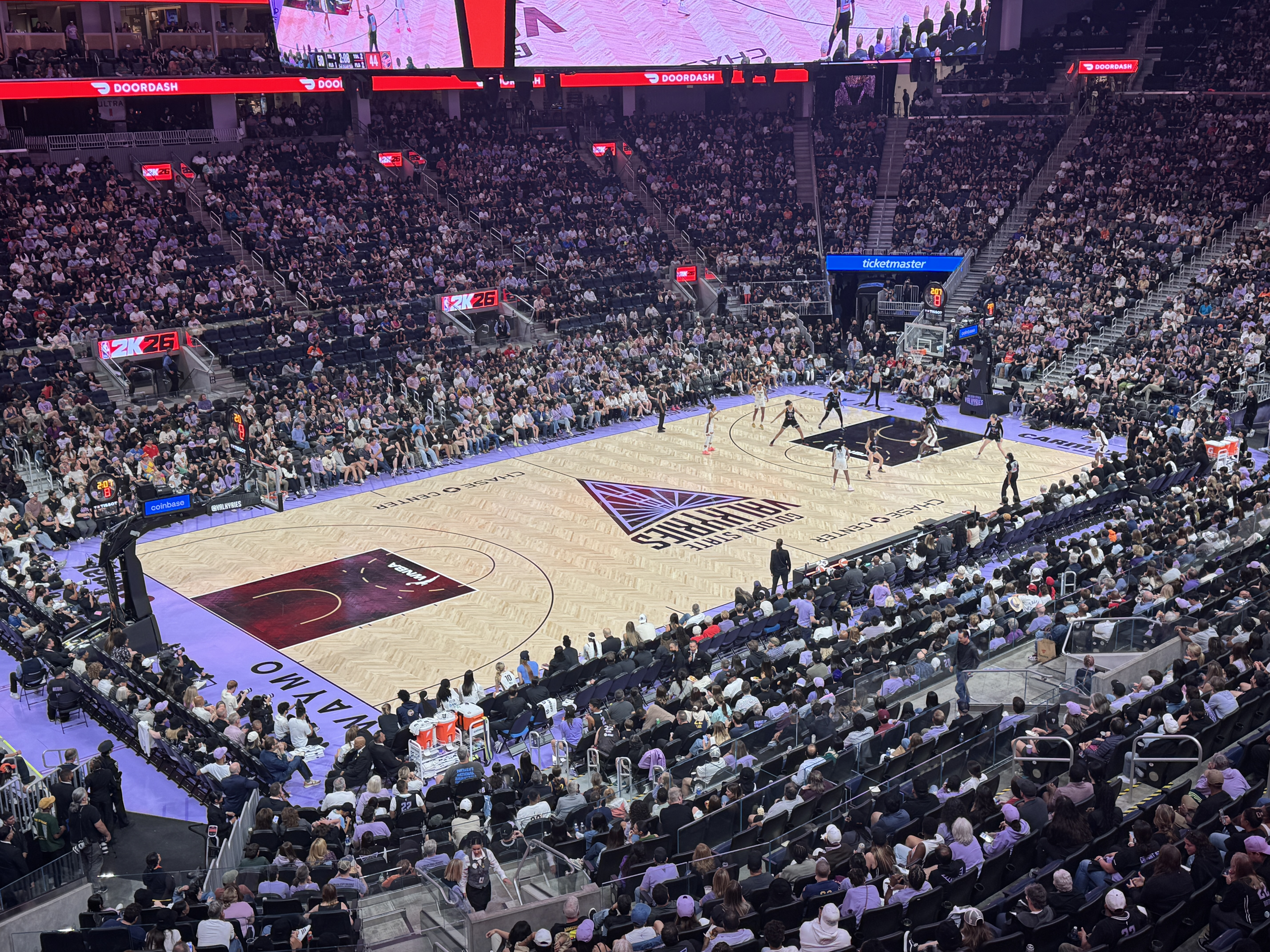
The Indiana Fever playing the Golden State Valkyries at Chase Center in San Francisco, Calif. on Aug. 31, 2025.

#	Team	W	L	PCT	GB	Conf.	Home	Road	Cup
1	yx – Minnesota Lynx	34	10	.773	–	20–4	20–2	14–8	5–1
2	x – Las Vegas Aces	30	14	.682	4	16–8	17–5	13–9	2–4
3	x – Atlanta Dream	30	14	.682	4	15–6	16–6	14–8	3–2
4	x – Phoenix Mercury	27	17	.614	7	13–11	15–7	12–10	4–2
5	x – New York Liberty	27	17	.614	7	15–5	17–5	10–12	4–1
6	cx – Indiana Fever	24	20	.545	10	13–8	13–9	11–11	4–1
7	x – Seattle Storm	23	21	.523	11	12–12	10–12	13–9	4–2
8	x – Golden State Valkyries	23	21	.523	11	9–15	14–8	9–13	3–3
9	e – Los Angeles Sparks	21	23	.477	13	10–14	9–13	12–10	2–4
10	e – Washington Mystics	16	28	.364	18	8–12	10–12	6–16	2–3
11	e – Connecticut Sun	11	33	.250	23	7–14	7–15	4–18	1–4
12	e – Chicago Sky	10	34	.227	24	4–17	6–16	4–18	1–4
13	e – Dallas Wings	10	34	.227	24	4–20	6–16	4–18	1–5

Notes

(#) – League Standing
c – Commissioner's Cup winners
y – Regular Season Champion
x – Clinched playoff berth
e – Eliminated from playoff contention
Source: Overall standings and Commissioner's Cup Standings

=== Schedule ===
2025 WNBA regular season
May

Date	Time (ET)	Matchup			TV	Result	High points	High rebounds	High assists	Location
Friday, May 16	7:30 p.m.	Atlanta	@	Washington	ION; League Pass	90–94	A. Gray (25)	B. Jones (10)	A. Gray (7)	CareFirst Arena; 4,200
Friday, May 16	7:30 p.m.	Minnesota	@	Dallas	ION; League Pass	99–84	Collier (34)	Shepard (8)	C. Williams (9)	College Park Center; 6,251
Friday, May 16	10:00 p.m.	Los Angeles	@	Golden State	USA: ION; League Pass; Canada: TSN2	84–67	Plum (37)	Hamby (10)	Tied (6)	Chase Center; 18,064
Saturday, May 17	1:00 p.m.	Las Vegas	@	New York	USA: ABC; ESPN+ Disney+ Canada: SN360	78–92	Wilson (31)	Wilson (16)	Cloud (9)	Barclays Center; 17,344
Saturday, May 17	3:00 p.m.	Chicago	@	Indiana	USA: ABC; ESPN+ Disney+ Canada: NBA TV Canada	58–93	C. Clark (20)	Reese (17)	C. Clark (10)	Gainbridge Fieldhouse; 17,274
Saturday, May 17	10:00 p.m.	Seattle	@	Phoenix	League Pass	59–81	S. Sabally (27)	Tied (8)	Thomas (6)	PHX Arena; 10,623
Sunday, May 18	1:00 p.m.	Washington	@	Connecticut	League Pass	90–85	Sykes (27)	Iriafen (14)	L. Allen (8)	Mohegan Sun Arena; 7,834
Sunday, May 18	6:00 p.m.	Minnesota	@	Los Angeles	USA: League Pass; Canada: NBA TV Canada	89–75	Collier (23)	Tied (10)	C. Williams (9)	Crypto.com Arena; 11,170
Monday, May 19	8:00 p.m.	Seattle	@	Dallas	USA: NBA TV; League Pass; Canada: SN1/SN360	79–71	Ogwumike (23)	Ogwumike (18)	Diggins (9)	College Park Center; 6,137
Tuesday, May 20	7:00 p.m.	Las Vegas	@	Connecticut	USA: League Pass; Canada: NBA TV Canada	87–62	Wilson (22)	Wilson (10)	Hartley (5)	Mohegan Sun Arena; 8,179
Tuesday, May 20	7:00 p.m.	Atlanta	@	Indiana	USA: NBA TV; League Pass; Canada: TSN1	91–90	C. Clark (27)	B. Jones (13)	C. Clark (11)	Gainbridge Fieldhouse; 16,269
Wednesday, May 21	8:00 p.m.	Dallas	@	Minnesota	USA: League Pass; Canada: NBA TV Canada	81–85	Collier (28)	Shepard (10)	Bueckers (10)	Target Center; 12,772
Wednesday, May 21	10:00 p.m.	Washington	@	Golden State	League Pass	74–76	Sykes (30)	Iriafen (12)	Melbourne (7)	Chase Center; 18,064
Wednesday, May 21	10:00 p.m.	Los Angeles	@	Phoenix	League Pass	86–89	Tied (25)	Stevens (17)	Thomas (7)	PHX Arena; 8,024
Thursday, May 22	7:30 p.m.	Indiana	@	Atlanta	Prime	81–76	N. Howard (26)	B. Jones (11)	C. Clark (6)	State Farm Arena; 17,044
Thursday, May 22	8:00 p.m.	New York	@	Chicago	League Pass	99–74	Cloud (18)	Reese (12)	Cloud (8)	Wintrust Arena; 9,025
Friday, May 23	7:30 p.m.	Connecticut	@	Minnesota	ION; League Pass	70–76	Collier (33)	Collier (11)	Mabrey (6)	Target Center; 8,224
Friday, May 23	10:00 p.m.	Washington	@	Las Vegas	ION; League Pass	72–75	Young (25)	Iriafen (13)	Dolson (8)	Michelob Ultra Arena; 10,509
Friday, May 23	10:00 p.m.	Golden State	@	Los Angeles	ION; League Pass	82–73	Hamby (25)	Tied (10)	Barker (4)	Crypto.com Arena; 10,857
Friday, May 23	10:00 p.m.	Phoenix	@	Seattle	ION; League Pass	70–77	Ogwumike (24)	Thomas (11)	Diggins (14)	Climate Pledge Arena; 9,091
Saturday, May 24	1:00 p.m.	New York	@	Indiana	CBS	90–88	Boston (27)	Boston (13)	C. Clark (10)	Gainbridge Fieldhouse; 17,274
Saturday, May 24	3:00 p.m.	Dallas	@	Atlanta	CBS Sports Network	75–83	A. Gray (27)	B. Jones (15)	R. Howard (10)	Gateway Center Arena; 3,265
Sunday, May 25	3:00 p.m.	Connecticut	@	Atlanta	USA: League Pass; Canada: NBA TV Canada	55–79	Coffey (18)	Coffey (11)	Caldwell (6)	Gateway Center Arena; 3,265
Sunday, May 25	6:00 p.m.	Washington	@	Phoenix	League Pass	62–68	Citron (14)	Iriafen (13)	Tied (5)	PHX Arena; 10,065
Sunday, May 25	6:00 p.m.	Chicago	@	Los Angeles	USA: League Pass; Canada: NBA TV Canada	78–91	Plum (28)	Reese (12)	Plum (8)	Crypto.com Arena; 11,422
Sunday, May 25	6:00 p.m.	Las Vegas	@	Seattle	League Pass	82–102	Ogwumike (23)	Ogwumike (8)	Diggins (8)	Climate Pledge Arena; 10,684
Tuesday, May 27	7:00 p.m.	Dallas	@	Connecticut	USA: League Pass; Canada: SN360	109–87	Charles (27)	Hines-Allen (7)	Tied (7)	Mohegan Sun Arena; 8,910
Tuesday, May 27	7:00 p.m.	Golden State	@	New York	League Pass	67–95	Stewart (24)	J. Jones (10)	Cloud (10)	Barclays Center; 14,774
Tuesday, May 27	8:00 p.m.	Seattle	@	Minnesota	USA: League Pass; Canada: NBA TV Canada	77–82	C. Williams (23)	Tied (10)	G. Williams (6)	Target Center; 7,808
Tuesday, May 27	10:00 p.m.	Chicago	@	Phoenix	League Pass	89–94	Atkins (21)	Reese (15)	Thomas (15)	PHX Arena; 8,818
Tuesday, May 27	10:00 p.m.	Atlanta	@	Los Angeles	USA: League Pass; Canada: NBA TV Canada	88–82	Hamby (28)	Stevens (11)	Hamby (8)	Crypto.com Arena; 10,797
Wednesday, May 28	7:30 p.m.	Indiana	@	Washington	USA: NBA TV; League Pass; Canada: NBA TV Canada	77–83	Tied (21)	Sykes (9)	Melbourne (5)	CFG Bank Arena; 11,183
Thursday, May 29	7:00 p.m.	Golden State	@	New York	League Pass	77–82	Stewart (27)	Salaün (13)	Vanloo (8)	Barclays Center; 14,951
Thursday, May 29	8:00 p.m.	Dallas	@	Chicago	Prime	92–97	Ogunbowale (37)	Reese (9)	Vandersloot (9)	Wintrust Arena; 9,025
Friday, May 30	7:30 p.m.	Connecticut	@	Indiana	ION; League Pass	85–83	Mabrey (26)	Nelson-Ododa (9)	Boston (7)	Gainbridge Fieldhouse; 16,213
Friday, May 30	7:30 p.m.	New York	@	Washington	ION; League Pass	85–63	Ionescu (28)	J. Jones (18)	Stewart (7)	CareFirst Arena; 4,200
Friday, May 30	10:00 p.m.	Minnesota	@	Phoenix	ION; League Pass	74–71	S. Sabally (26)	S. Sabally (11)	C. Williams (6)	PHX Arena; 9,043
Friday, May 30	10:00 p.m.	Atlanta	@	Seattle	ION; League Pass	94–87	R. Howard (33)	Magbegor (8)	Tied (5)	Climate Pledge Arena; 9,666
Friday, May 30	10:00 p.m.	Los Angeles	@	Las Vegas	USA: ION; League Pass; Canada: TSN3/4	81–96	Wilson (35)	Wilson (13)	Wilson (6)	Michelob Ultra Arena; 10,504
Saturday, May 31	8:00 p.m.	Chicago	@	Dallas	League Pass	94–83	Atkins (26)	Reese (9)	Vandersloot (7)	College Park Center; 6,251

June

Date	Time (ET)	Matchup			TV	Result	High points	High rebounds	High assists	Location
Sunday, June 1	3:00 p.m.	Connecticut	@	New York	USA: League Pass; Canada: NBA TV Canada	52–100	Ionescu (18)	J. Jones (11)	Cloud (7)	Barclays Center; 17,415
Sunday, June 1	6:00 p.m.	Phoenix	@	Los Angeles	USA: League Pass; Canada: NBA TV Canada	85–80	Sims (32)	S. Sabally (9)	Tied (6)	Crypto.com Arena; 11,033
Sunday, June 1	6:00 p.m.	Las Vegas	@	Seattle	League Pass	75–70	G. Williams (20)	Magbegor (9)	C. Gray (6)	Climate Pledge Arena; 10,201
Sunday, June 1	8:30 p.m.	Minnesota	@	Golden State	USA: League Pass; Canada: NBA TV Canada	86–75	Collier (24)	Collier (11)	C. Williams (5)	Chase Center; 18,064
Tuesday, June 3	7:00 p.m.	Washington	@	Indiana	USA: NBA TV; League Pass; Canada: SN360	76–85	Mitchell (24)	Iriafen (9)	McDonald (5)	Gainbridge Fieldhouse; 16,013
Tuesday, June 3	8:00 p.m.	Phoenix	@	Minnesota	ESPN3; League Pass	65–88	Collier (18)	Collier (11)	McBride (7)	Target Center; 8,722
Tuesday, June 3	9:30 p.m.	Dallas	@	Seattle	USA: ESPN; Canada: TSN4/5	77–83	Carrington (22)	Hines-Allen (11)	Wheeler (7)	Climate Pledge Arena; 10,252
Thursday, June 5	7:30 p.m.	New York	@	Washington	Prime	86–78	Stewart (26)	Tied (11)	Ionescu (7)	CareFirst Arena; 4,200
Thursday, June 5	10:00 p.m.	Golden State	@	Phoenix	Prime	77–86	Held (24)	Fágbénlé (11)	Tied (5)	PHX Arena; 9,943
Friday, June 6	7:30 p.m.	Atlanta	@	Connecticut	ION; League Pass	76–84	Mabrey (34)	Griner (6)	Tied (6)	Mohegan Sun Arena; 8,078
Friday, June 6	9:30 p.m.	Los Angeles	@	Dallas	ION; League Pass	93–79	Stevens (21)	Geiselsöder (10)	Plum (9)	College Park Center; 6,007
Saturday, June 7	3:00 p.m.	Las Vegas	@	Golden State	USA: ABC; ESPN+ Canada: NBA TV Canada	68–95	Thornton (22)	Thornton (11)	Burton (12)	Chase Center; 18,064
Saturday, June 7	8:00 p.m.	Indiana	@	Chicago	CBS	79–52	Mitchell (17)	Reese (12)	Boston (5)	United Center; 19,496
Saturday, June 7	10:00 p.m.	Seattle	@	Phoenix	League Pass	89–77	Diggins (26)	Magbegor (8)	Diggins (7)	PHX Arena; 9,876
Sunday, June 8	3:00 p.m.	Connecticut	@	Washington	USA: League Pass; Canada: NBA TV Canada	104–67	Sykes (28)	Tied (9)	Mabrey (8)	CareFirst Arena; 4,200
Sunday, June 8	4:00 p.m.	Minnesota	@	Dallas	League Pass	81–65	Ogunbowale (28)	Siegrist (11)	C. Williams (8)	College Park Center; 6,162
Monday, June 9	10:00 p.m.	Golden State	@	Los Angeles	USA: League Pass; Canada: TSN3/4	89–81 (OT)	Plum (24)	Fágbénlé (13)	Vanloo (8)	Crypto.com Arena; 10,921
Tuesday, June 10	7:30 p.m.	Indiana	@	Atlanta	ESPN3; League Pass	58–77	A. Gray (23)	Tied (10)	Tied (5)	Gateway Center Arena; 3,265
Tuesday, June 10	8:00 p.m.	Chicago	@	New York	USA: ESPN; Canada: TSN2	66–85	Ionescu (23)	Reese (11)	Ionescu (7)	Barclays Center; 16,081
Wednesday, June 11	10:00 p.m.	Los Angeles	@	Las Vegas	CBS Sports Network	97–89	Young (34)	Stevens (10)	Plum (9)	Michelob Ultra Arena; 10,417
Wednesday, June 11	10:00 p.m.	Dallas	@	Phoenix	USA: League Pass; Canada: NBA TV Canada	80–93	Bueckers (35)	S. Sabally (9)	Thomas (10)	PHX Arena; 13,001
Wednesday, June 11	10:00 p.m.	Minnesota	@	Seattle	League Pass	84–94	Collier (25)	Ogwumike (10)	Wheeler (9)	Climate Pledge Arena; 9,722
Friday, June 13	7:30 p.m.	Chicago	@	Atlanta	ION; League Pass	70–88	R. Howard (36)	B. Jones (11)	Canada (8)	Gateway Center Arena; 3,296
Friday, June 13	10:00 p.m.	Dallas	@	Las Vegas	ION; League Pass	84–88	Young (28)	Tied (8)	Ogunbowale (8)	Michelob Ultra Arena; 10,428
Saturday, June 14	1:00 p.m.	Los Angeles	@	Minnesota	CBS	77–101	Collier (32)	Hamby (12)	Collier (6)	Target Center; 10,810
Saturday, June 14	3:00 p.m.	New York	@	Indiana	USA: ABC; ESPN+ Canada: SN360	88–102	Ionescu (34)	Boston (11)	C. Clark (9)	Gainbridge Fieldhouse; 17,274
Saturday, June 14	8:30 p.m.	Seattle	@	Golden State	League Pass	70–76	Thornton (22)	Thornton (12)	Burton (9)	Chase Center; 18,064
Sunday, June 15	12:00 p.m.	Chicago	@	Connecticut	CBS	78–66	Mabrey (22)	Reese (13)	Reese (11)	Mohegan Sun Arena; 8,451
Sunday, June 15	2:00 p.m.	Atlanta	@	Washington	CBS Sports Network	89–56	A. Gray (32)	Hillmon (11)	Tied (5)	CareFirst Arena; 4,200
Sunday, June 15	6:00 p.m.	Phoenix	@	Las Vegas	League Pass	76–70	S. Sabally (22)	Stokes (14)	Thomas (13)	Michelob Ultra Arena; 10,497
Tuesday, June 17	7:00 p.m.	Connecticut	@	Indiana	USA: NBA TV; League Pass; Canada: SN360	71–88	Tied (20)	N. Howard (12)	C. Clark (6)	Gainbridge Fieldhouse `6,284
Tuesday, June 17	7:00 p.m.	Atlanta	@	New York	League Pass	81–86	Ionescu (34)	J. Jones (10)	R. Howard (9)	Barclays Center; 15,149
Tuesday, June 17	8:00 p.m.	Washington	@	Chicago	League Pass	79–72	Sykes (32)	Tied (10)	Atkins (7)	Wintrust Arena; 7,579
Tuesday, June 17	8:00 p.m.	Golden State	@	Dallas	League Pass	71–80	Bueckers (20)	N. Smith (10)	Ogunbowale (6)	College Park Center; 6,061
Tuesday, June 17	8:00 p.m.	Las Vegas	@	Minnesota	USA: League Pass; NBA TV Canada	62–76	C. Williams (20)	A. Smith (13)	Tied (6)	Target Center; 8,802
Tuesday, June 17	10:00 p.m.	Seattle	@	Los Angeles	USA: NBA TV; League Pass; NBA TV Canada	98–67	Ogwumike (26)	Stevens (10)	Tied (7)	Crypto.com Arena; 10,581
Wednesday, June 18	7:00 p.m.	Phoenix	@	Connecticut	League Pass	83–75	Morrow (16)	S. Sabally (15)	Thomas (11)	Mohegan Sun Arena; 7,864
Thursday, June 19	7:00 p.m.	Phoenix	@	New York	Prime	89–81	Stewart (35)	Thomas (15)	Cloud (10)	Barclays Center; 16,383
Thursday, June 19	10:00 p.m.	Indiana	@	Golden State	Prime	77–88	Boston (17)	Boston (12)	C. Clark (9)	Chase Center; 18,064
Friday, June 20	7:30 p.m.	Washington	@	Atlanta	ION; League Pass	91–92	Austin (28)	Austin (10)	Sykes (8)	Gateway Center Arena; 3,265
Friday, June 20	7:30 p.m.	Dallas	@	Connecticut	USA: ION; League Pass; Canada: TSN2	86–83	Charles (26)	Tied (9)	Bueckers (7)	Mohegan Sun Arena; 8,910
Friday, June 20	10:00 p.m.	Seattle	@	Las Vegas	ION; League Pass	90–83	Ogwumike (25)	Wilson (14)	C. Gray (7)	Michelob Ultra Arena; 10,428
Saturday, June 21	1:00 p.m.	Phoenix	@	Chicago	USA: ABC; ESPN+ Canada: TSN5	104–86	Tied (17)	Tied (5)	Thomas (8)	Wintrust Arena; 7,291
Saturday, June 21	8:00 p.m.	Los Angeles	@	Minnesota	USA: NBA TV; League Pass; Canada: NBA TV Canada	66–82	McBride (29)	Stevens (9)	Tied (6)	Target Center; 8,777
Sunday, June 22	3:00 p.m.	Chicago	@	Atlanta	ESPN3; League Pass	80–93	Atkins (29)	Reese (19)	Tied (4)	Gateway Center Arena; 3,283
Sunday, June 22	3:00 p.m.	Dallas	@	Washington	ESPN3; League Pass	88–91 (OT)	Tied (27)	Citron (11)	Bueckers (7)	CareFirst Arena; 4,200
Sunday, June 22	3:00 p.m.	Indiana	@	Las Vegas	USA: ESPN, ESPN+, Disney+ Canada: SN1	81–89	Boston (26)	Boston (10)	C. Clark (10)	T-Mobile Arena; 18,547
Sunday, June 22	7:00 p.m.	New York	@	Seattle	League Pass	79–89	Ogwumike (26)	Tied (9)	G. Williams (10)	Climate Pledge Arena; 12,500
Sunday, June 22	8:30 p.m.	Connecticut	@	Golden State	USA: League Pass; Canada: NBA TV Canada	63–87	Thornton (21)	Amihere (12)	Talbot (4)	Chase Center; 18,064
Tuesday, June 24	8:00 p.m.	Minnesota	@	Washington	League Pass	64–68	A. Smith (26)	Shepard (15)	Melbourne (5)	CareFirst Arena; 4,200
Tuesday, June 24	8:00 p.m.	Los Angeles	@	Chicago	USA: NBA TV; Canada: NBA TV Canada	86–97	Cardoso (27)	Reese (17)	Reese (6)	Wintrust Arena; 8,004
Tuesday, June 24	8:00 p.m.	Atlanta	@	Dallas	League Pass	55–68	R. Howard (23)	Yueru (15)	Tied (4)	College Park Center; 6,251
Tuesday, June 24	10:00 p.m.	Indiana	@	Seattle	USA: NBA TV; Canada: NBA TV Canada	94–86	Boston (31)	Hull (11)	C. Clark (9)	Climate Pledge Arena; 18,343
Wednesday, June 25	10:00 p.m.	New York	@	Golden State	League Pass	81–78	Stewart (23)	Stewart (10)	Burton (10)	Chase Center; 18,064
Wednesday, June 25	10:00 p.m.	Connecticut	@	Las Vegas	USA: NBA TV; Canada: NBA TV Canada	59–85	Wilson (22)	Tied (8)	C. Gray (6)	Michelob Ultra Arena; 10,432
Thursday, June 26	7:00 p.m.	Los Angeles	@	Indiana	Prime	85–75	Stevens (23)	Boston (10)	Plum (6)	Gainbridge Fieldhouse; 17,274
Thursday, June 26	10:00 p.m.	Washington	@	Las Vegas	Prime	94–83	Wilson (22)	Austin (13)	C. Gray (8)	Michelob Ultra Arena; 10,427
Friday, June 27	7:30 p.m.	Minnesota	@	Atlanta	ION; League Pass	96–92 (OT)	Collier (26)	Tied (8)	Tied (8)	Gateway Center Arena; 3,265
Friday, June 27	7:30 p.m.	Indiana	@	Dallas	USA: ION; League Pass; Canada: TSN5	94–86	Mitchell (32)	N. Howard (13)	Mitchell (7)	American Airlines Center; 20,409
Friday, June 27	10:00 p.m.	Chicago	@	Golden State	ION; League Pass	78–83	Thornton (29)	Reese (18)	Tied (4)	Chase Center; 18,064
Friday, June 27	10:00 p.m.	New York	@	Phoenix	ION; League Pass	91–106	S. Sabally (25)	Thomas (9)	Thomas (15)	PHX Arena; 12,009
Friday, June 27	10:00 p.m.	Connecticut	@	Seattle	ION; League Pass	81–97	Diggins (24)	Morrow (11)	G. Williams (7)	Climate Pledge Arena; 10,776
Saturday, June 28	8:00 p.m.	Washington	@	Dallas	League Pass	71–79	Citron (22)	Citron (10)	Tied (5)	College Park Center; 6,006
Sunday, June 29	3:00 p.m.	New York	@	Atlanta	NBA TV; League Pass	81–90	Tied (21)	Tied (9)	Canada (8)	Gateway Center Arena; 3,265
Sunday, June 29	4:00 p.m.	Chicago	@	Los Angeles	USA: ESPN; Canada: TSN2	92–85	Reese (24)	Reese (16)	Tied (7)	Crypto.com Arena; 13,523
Sunday, June 29	6:00 p.m.	Las Vegas	@	Phoenix	USA: NBA TV; League Pass; Canada: SN360	84–81	Wilson (26)	Wilson (18)	Thomas (8)	PHX Arena; 13,247
Sunday, June 29	7:00 p.m.	Connecticut	@	Minnesota	USA: League Pass; Canada: NBA TV Canada	63–102	Collier (23)	Morrow (11)	Tied (7)	Target Center; 8,821
Sunday, June 29	8:30 p.m.	Seattle	@	Golden State	League Pass	57–84	Hayes (21)	Amihere (8)	Diggins (6)	Chase Center; 18,064

July

Date	Time (ET)	Matchup			TV	Result	High points	High rebounds	High assists	Location
Tuesday, July 1	8:00 p.m.	Commissioner's Cup Final			Prime	74–59	N. Howard (16)	N. Howard (12)	Boston (6)	Target Center; 12,778
Tuesday, July 1	8:00 p.m.	Indiana	@	Minnesota	Prime	74–59	N. Howard (16)	N. Howard (12)	Boston (6)	Target Center; 12,778
Thursday, July 3	7:00 p.m.	Las Vegas	@	Indiana	Prime	54–81	Wilson (29)	N. Howard (10)	McDonald (7)	Gainbridge Fieldhouse; 16,509
Thursday, July 3	7:00 p.m.	Los Angeles	@	New York	USA: League Pass; Canada: NBA TV Canada	79–89	Hamby (25)	Stewart (14)	Plum (8)	Barclays Center; 15,956
Thursday, July 3	7:30 p.m.	Seattle	@	Atlanta	League Pass	80–79	Canada (25)	A. Gray (11)	G. Williams (6)	Gateway Center Arena; 3,265
Thursday, July 3	8:00 p.m.	Phoenix	@	Dallas	League Pass	89–98	Copper (33)	Yueru (11)	Thomas (10)	College Park Center; 6,162
Thursday, July 3	8:00 p.m.	Washington	@	Minnesota	League Pass	75–92	Collier (28)	Iriafen (7)	C. Williams (8)	Target Center; 8,824
Saturday, July 5	7:00 p.m.	Los Angeles	@	Indiana	USA: League Pass; Canada: TSN4	89–87	Boston (23)	Tied (12)	McDonald (8)	Gainbridge Fieldhouse; 17,274
Saturday, July 5	8:00 p.m.	Golden State	@	Minnesota	USA: League Pass; Canada: NBA TV Canada	71–82	Hayes (23)	Tied (10)	A. Smith (6)	Target Center; 8,771
Sunday, July 6	1:00 p.m.	Seattle	@	New York	CBS	79–70	Ionescu (22)	Ionescu (9)	Tied (6)	Barclays Center; 15,515
Sunday, July 6	4:00 p.m.	Las Vegas	@	Connecticut	League Pass	86–68	Wilson (19)	N. Smith (10)	C. Gray (8)	Mohegan Sun Arena; 8,476
Sunday, July 6	7:00 p.m.	Chicago	@	Minnesota	League Pass	75–80	C. Williams (25)	Reese (17)	Tied (6)	Target Center; 8,810
Monday, July 7	7:30 p.m.	Golden State	@	Atlanta	League Pass	81–90	A. Gray (24)	B. Jones (8)	Canada (9)	Gateway Center Arena; 3,265
Monday, July 7	10:00 p.m.	Dallas	@	Phoenix	League Pass	72–102	Whitcomb (36)	Tied (10)	Thomas (15)	PHX Arena; 11,932
Tuesday, July 8	11:30 a.m.	Chicago	@	Washington	League Pass	79–81	Reese (22)	Reese (15)	Atkins (5)	EagleBank Arena; 9,350
Tuesday, July 8	8:00 p.m.	Las Vegas	@	New York	USA: ESPN; Canada: TSN1/3/4	78–87	Ionescu (28)	Fiebich (9)	Ionescu (8)	Barclays Center; 15,041
Wednesday, July 9	11:00 a.m.	Seattle	@	Connecticut	League Pass	83–93	Charles (29)	Ogwumike (12)	Tied (7)	Mohegan Sun Arena; 7,984
Wednesday, July 9	12:00 p.m.	Golden State	@	Indiana	USA: NBA TV; League Pass; Canada: SN360, NBA TV Canada	80–61	Burton (21)	Hull (9)	Tied (6)	Gainbridge Fieldhouse; 16,798
Wednesday, July 9	3:30 p.m.	Minnesota	@	Phoenix	League Pass	71–79	Thomas (29)	A. Smith (9)	Whitcomb (5)	PHX Arena; 10,083
Wednesday, July 9	8:00 p.m.	Dallas	@	Chicago	League Pass	76–87	R. Allen (27)	Reese (11)	E. Williams (6)	Wintrust Arena; 9,025
Thursday, July 10	3:00 p.m.	Minnesota	@	Los Angeles	League Pass	91–82	Hiedeman (18)	Stevens (10)	Plum (12)	Crypto.com Arena; 18,199
Thursday, July 10	7:30 p.m.	Las Vegas	@	Washington	Prime	68–70	Loyd (20)	Tied (8)	Sutton (6)	EagleBank Arena; 9,350
Friday, July 11	7:30 p.m.	Atlanta	@	Indiana	ION; League Pass	82–99	Canada (30)	Cunningham (10)	C. Clark (9)	Gainbridge Fieldhouse; 16,966
Friday, July 11	10:00 p.m.	Connecticut	@	Seattle	ION; League Pass	65–79	Charles (20)	Charles (10)	Tied (5)	Climate Pledge Arena; 9,569
Saturday, July 12	1:00 p.m.	Minnesota	@	Chicago	USA: ABC; ESPN+ Canada: TSN5	81–87	Atkins (27)	Cardoso (15)	C. Williams (8)	Wintrust Arena; 9,025
Saturday, July 12	4:00 p.m.	Golden State	@	Las Vegas	CBS	102–104	Wilson (34)	Wilson (16)	Burton (8)	Michelob Ultra Arena; 10,070
Sunday, July 13	1:00 p.m.	Dallas	@	Indiana	USA: ABC; ESPN+ Canada: TSN5	83–102	Bueckers (21)	Tied (7)	C. Clark (13)	Gainbridge Fieldhouse; 17,274
Sunday, July 13	3:00 p.m.	Atlanta	@	New York	League Pass	72–79	Fiebich (21)	Tied (10)	Canada (6)	Barclays Center; 17,265
Sunday, July 13	6:00 p.m.	Connecticut	@	Los Angeles	League Pass	88–92	Hartley (25)	Stevens (11)	Tied (6)	Crypto.com Arena
Sunday, July 13	6:00 p.m.	Washington	@	Seattle	League Pass	74–69	Tied (19)	Iriafen (10)	Austin (5)	Climate Pledge Arena; 11,126
Monday, July 14	8:00 p.m.	Minnesota	@	Chicago	League Pass	91–78	Collier (29)	Reese (10)	C. Williams (7)	Wintrust Arena; 8,105
Monday, July 14	10:00 p.m.	Phoenix	@	Golden State	League Pass	78–77	Bonner (22)	Bonner (11)	Thomas (11)	Chase Center
Tuesday, July 15	8:00 p.m.	Indiana	@	Connecticut	USA: ESPN; Canada: SN	85–77	Charles (21)	N. Howard (13)	C. Clark (7)	TD Garden; 19,156
Tuesday, July 15	10:00 p.m.	Washington	@	Los Angeles	League Pass	80–99	Hamby (26)	Tied (8)	Allemand (10)	Crypto.com Arena; 10,787
Wednesday, July 16	12:00 p.m.	Atlanta	@	Chicago	League Pass	86–49	Griner (15)	Cardoso (11)	Canada (8)	Wintrust Arena; 9,025
Wednesday, July 16	1:00 p.m.	Phoenix	@	Minnesota	League Pass	66–79	McBride (18)	Mack (13)	Thomas (9)	Target Center; 16,421
Wednesday, July 16	3:00 p.m.	Golden State	@	Seattle	League Pass	58–67	Ogwumike (22)	Tied (8)	Diggins (6)	Climate Pledge Arena; 12,500
Wednesday, July 16	7:30 p.m.	Indiana	@	New York	CBS Sports Network	77–98	Stewart (24)	Stewart (11)	Ionescu (9)	Barclays Center; 17,371
Wednesday, July 16	8:00 p.m.	Las Vegas	@	Dallas	League Pass	90–86	Wilson (37)	Wilson (10)	Bueckers (8)	College Park Center; 6,153
Saturday, July 19	8:30 p.m.	WNBA All-Star Game			USA: ABC, ESPN+, Disney+ Canada: TBA	151–131	Collier (36)	Tied (11)	Diggins (15)	Gainbridge Fieldhouse; 16,988
Saturday, July 19	8:30 p.m.	Team Collier	@	Team Clark	USA: ABC, ESPN+, Disney+ Canada: TBA	151–131	Collier (36)	Tied (11)	Diggins (15)	Gainbridge Fieldhouse; 16,988
Tuesday, July 22	7:30 p.m.	Los Angeles	@	Washington	ESPN3; League Pass	93–86	Hamby (24)	Hamby (14)	Plum (7)	CareFirst Arena; 4,200
Tuesday, July 22	8:00 p.m.	Indiana	@	New York	ESPN	84–98	Mitchell (29)	Boston (12)	Ionescu (9)	Barclays Center; 17,365
Tuesday, July 22	8:00 p.m.	Chicago	@	Minnesota	ESPN3; League Pass	68–91	Tied (19)	Reese (11)	C. Williams (7)	Target Center; 8,821
Tuesday, July 22	10:00 p.m.	Atlanta	@	Las Vegas	ESPN	72–87	Tied (24)	Wilson (12)	Young (7)	Michelob Ultra Arena; 10,361
Tuesday, July 22	10:00 p.m.	Dallas	@	Seattle	ESPN3; League Pass	87–63	Ogwumike (22)	Yueru (10)	G. Williams (8)	Climate Pledge Arena; 12,500
Wednesday, July 23	10:00 p.m.	Atlanta	@	Phoenix	CBS Sports Network	90–79	A. Gray (28)	Thomas (11)	Thomas (9)	PHX Arena; 11,850
Thursday, July 24	7:00 p.m.	Los Angeles	@	Connecticut	League Pass	101–86	Plum (30)	Hamby (11)	Tied (6)	Mohegan Sun Arena; 7,375
Thursday, July 24	7:00 p.m.	Las Vegas	@	Indiana	Prime	70–80	Mitchell (21)	N. Howard (13)	Tied (4)	Gainbridge Fieldhouse; 16,166
Thursday, July 24	8:30 p.m.	Seattle	@	Chicago	League Pass	95–57	Diggins (21)	Cardoso (13)	G. Williams (7)	Wintrust Arena; 7,750
Friday, July 25	7:30 p.m.	Phoenix	@	New York	ION; League Pass	76–89	Ionescu (29)	Thomas (13)	Tied (8)	Barclays Center; 17,515
Friday, July 25	7:30 p.m.	Las Vegas	@	Minnesota	ION; League Pass	78–109	Collier (25)	Collier (13)	Tied (5)	Target Center; 8,810
Friday, July 25	10:00 p.m.	Dallas	@	Golden State	ION; League Pass	76–86	Tied (17)	Tied (9)	Bueckers (6)	Chase Center; 18,024
Saturday, July 26	7:00 p.m.	Los Angeles	@	New York	NBA TV; League Pass	101–99	Ionescu (30)	Stevens (11)	Allemand (10)	Barclays Center; 16,024
Saturday, July 26	7:30 p.m.	Seattle	@	Washington	League Pass	58–69	Ogwumike (18)	Tied (11)	Wheeler (6)	CareFirst Arena; 4,200
Sunday, July 27	1:00 p.m.	Golden State	@	Connecticut	CBS Sports Network	64–95	Charles (24)	Morrow (11)	Tied (4)	Mohegan Sun Arena; 8,294
Sunday, July 27	3:00 p.m.	Indiana	@	Chicago	ABC; ESPN+	93–78	Mitchell (35)	Cardoso (12)	Tied (6)	United Center; 19,601
Sunday, July 27	4:00 p.m.	Las Vegas	@	Dallas	ESPN3; League Pass	106–80	Young (24)	McCowan (13)	Tied (8)	College Park Center; 6,251
Sunday, July 27	6:00 p.m.	Phoenix	@	Washington	League Pass	88–72	Thomas (27)	Thomas (11)	Thomas (8)	CareFirst Arena; 4,200
Sunday, July 27	7:00 p.m.	Atlanta	@	Minnesota	NBA TV; League Pass	90–86	Collier (32)	Hillmon (9)	C. Williams (9)	Target Center; 8,788
Monday, July 28	7:00 p.m.	Seattle	@	Connecticut	ESPN3; League Pass	101–85	Ogwumike (26)	Diggins (12)	Diggins (11)	Mohegan Sun Arena; 7,136
Monday, July 28	8:00 p.m.	New York	@	Dallas	ESPN	82–92	Tied (20)	Ogunbowale (14)	Cloud (8)	College Park Center; 6,018
Tuesday, July 29	7:30 p.m.	Golden State	@	Atlanta	League Pass	77–75	Canada (21)	Tied (8)	Canada (8)	Gateway Center Arena; 3,265
Tuesday, July 29	7:30 p.m.	Chicago	@	Washington	League Pass	86–103	Citron (28)	Reese (13)	Sykes (5)	CareFirst Arena; 4,200
Tuesday, July 29	10:00 p.m.	Las Vegas	@	Los Angeles	NBA TV; League Pass	89–74	Wilson (34)	Young (11)	Young (11)	Crypto.com Arena; 12,449
Wednesday, July 30	7:00 p.m.	Phoenix	@	Indiana	ESPN3; League Pass	101–107	Thomas (32)	Thomas (15)	Thomas (7)	Gainbridge Fieldhouse; 17,274
Wednesday, July 30	8:00 p.m.	Atlanta	@	Dallas	ESPN3; League Pass	88–85	Tied (21)	Paopao (8)	Tied (7)	College Park Center; 5,228
Wednesday, July 30	8:00 p.m.	New York	@	Minnesota	ESPN	93–100	Ionescu (31)	Tied (9)	C. Williams (13)	Target Center; 10,824
Thursday, July 31	7:30 p.m.	Golden State	@	Washington	Prime	68–67	Citron (16)	Austin (9)	Burton (10)	CareFirst Arena; 4,200

August

Date	Time (ET)	Matchup			TV	Result	High points	High rebounds	High assists	Location
Friday, August 1	7:30 p.m.	Phoenix	@	Atlanta	ION; League Pass	72–95	A. Gray (26)	Thomas (10)	Canada (11)	Gateway Center Arena; 3,283
Friday, August 1	7:30 p.m.	New York	@	Connecticut	ION; League Pass	62–78	Ionescu (23)	Morrow (11)	Mabrey (8)	Mohegan Sun Arena; 8,664
Friday, August 1	7:30 p.m.	Golden State	@	Chicago	ION; League Pass	73–66	Burton (18)	Cardoso (11)	Tied (7)	Wintrust Arena; 7,714
Friday, August 1	7:30 p.m.	Indiana	@	Dallas	ION; League Pass	88–78	Mitchell (23)	N. Howard (16)	McDonald (6)	American Airlines Center; 17,857
Friday, August 1	10:00 p.m.	Los Angeles	@	Seattle	ION; League Pass	108–106 (2OT)	Ogwumike (37)	Hamby (13)	G. Williams (8)	Climate Pledge Arena; 11,354
Saturday, August 2	3:00 p.m.	Minnesota	@	Las Vegas	ABC; ESPN+	111–58	McBride (24)	Shepard (14)	C. Williams (9)	Michelob Ultra Arena; 10,488
Sunday, August 3	1:00 p.m.	New York	@	Connecticut	League Pas	87–78	Ionescu (36)	Ionescu (11)	Tied (4)	Mohegan Sun Arena; 8,747
Sunday, August 3	3:00 p.m.	Washington	@	Atlanta	ESPN3; League Pass	83–99	B. Jones (23)	Hillmon (13)	Canada (9)	Gateway Center Arena; 3,315
Sunday, August 3	3:00 p.m.	Indiana	@	Seattle	ABC; ESPN+	78–74	N. Howard (21)	Boston (12)	McDonald (9)	Climate Pledge Arena; 16,819
Sunday, August 3	6:00 p.m.	Phoenix	@	Chicago	League Pass	83–67	Copper (25)	E. Williams (15)	Thomas (10)	Wintrust Arena; 7,081
Sunday, August 3	6:00 p.m.	Golden State	@	Las Vegas	League Pass	77–101	Loyd (27)	Wilson (14)	Young (8)	Michelob Ultra Arena; 10,445
Tuesday, August 5	7:00 p.m.	Dallas	@	New York	NBA TV; League Pass	76–85	Bueckers (21)	Tied (10)	Cloud (6)	Barclays Center; 17,306
Tuesday, August 5	8:00 p.m.	Washington	@	Chicago	League Pass	64–78	E. Williams (18)	Cardoso (13)	Tied (5)	Wintrust Arena; 6,572
Tuesday, August 5	10:00 p.m.	Indiana	@	Los Angeles	CBS Sports Network	91–100	Mitchell (34)	Boston (9)	Plum (11)	Crypto.com Arena; 16,035
Tuesday, August 5	10:00 p.m.	Connecticut	@	Phoenix	League Pass	66–82	S. Sabally (23)	Thomas (12)	Thomas (12)	PHX Arena; 8,083
Tuesday, August 5	10:00 p.m.	Minnesota	@	Seattle	League Pass	91–87	Ogwumike (23)	Shepard (13)	Diggins (7)	Climate Pledge Arena; 10,468
Wednesday, August 6	10:00 p.m.	Las Vegas	@	Golden State	NBA TV; League Pass	78–72	Wilson (27)	Tied (9)	Young (4)	Chase Center; 18,064
Thursday, August 7	8:00 p.m.	Atlanta	@	Chicago	Prime	86–65	A. Gray (25)	Hillmon (11)	Canada (6)	Wintrust Arena; 7,221
Thursday, August 7	10:00 p.m.	Connecticut	@	Los Angeles	League Pass	91–102	Hamby (21)	Allemand (10)	Allemand (11)	Crypto.com Arena; 10,780
Thursday, August 7	10:00 p.m.	Indiana	@	Phoenix	Prime	60–95	Bonner (23)	Thomas (11)	Thomas (10)	PHX Arena; 17,071
Friday, August 8	7:30 p.m.	New York	@	Dallas	ION; League Pass	88–77	Ogunbowale (17)	Meesseman (8)	Meesseman (7)	College Park Center; 6,251
Friday, August 8	7:30 p.m.	Washington	@	Minnesota	ION; League Pass	76–80	Citron (26)	Iriafen (9)	C. Williams (5)	Target Center; 8,821
Friday, August 8	10:00 p.m.	Seattle	@	Las Vegas	ION; League Pass	86–90	Wilson (29)	Tied (12)	Tied (6)	Michelob Ultra Arena; 10,415
Saturday, August 9	8:00 p.m.	Chicago	@	Indiana	CBS	70–92	Mitchell (26)	Cardoso (12)	Mitchell (8)	Gainbridge Fieldhouse; 17,274
Saturday, August 9	8:30 p.m.	Los Angeles	@	Golden State	League Pass	59–72	Burton (16)	Salaün (8)	Hayes (6)	Chase Center; 18,064
Sunday, August 10	12:30 p.m.	Minnesota	@	New York	ABC; ESPN+	83–71	McBride (18)	A. Smith (9)	Tied (7)	Barclays Center; 17,343
Sunday, August 10	4:00 p.m.	Washington	@	Dallas	CBS Sports Network	91–78	Iriafen (23)	Hines-Allen (11)	Citron (6)	College Park Center; 6,152
Sunday, August 10	6:00 p.m.	Atlanta	@	Phoenix	NBA TV; League Pass	74–66	Thomas (21)	Hillmon (13)	Tied (5)	PHX Arena; 13,953
Sunday, August 10	8:00 p.m.	Seattle	@	Los Angeles	League Pass	91–94	Sykes (27)	Malonga (11)	Allemand (8)	Crypto.com Arena; 11,796
Sunday, August 10	9:00 p.m.	Connecticut	@	Las Vegas	NBA TV; League Pass	86–94	Wilson (32)	Wilson (20)	Tied (6)	Michelob Ultra Arena; 10,407
Monday, August 11	10:00 p.m.	Connecticut	@	Golden State	League Pass	57–74	Tied (17)	Morrow (14)	Burton (10)	Chase Center; 18,604
Tuesday, August 12	7:30 p.m.	Dallas	@	Indiana	ESPN	81–80	Mitchell (24)	N. Howard (12)	Hines-Allen (9)	Gainbridge Fieldhouse; 16,027
Tuesday, August 12	10:00 p.m.	New York	@	Los Angeles	NBA TV; League Pass	105–97	Plum (26)	J. Jones (11)	Tied (6)	Crypto.com Arena; 11,862
Wednesday, August 13	7:00 p.m.	Chicago	@	Connecticut	League Pass	62–71	Cardoso (24)	E. Williams (15)	Rivers (6)	Mohegan Sun Arena; 6,848
Wednesday, August 13	7:30 p.m.	Golden State	@	Washington	League Pass	88–83	Burton (30)	Iriafen (10)	Tied (7)	CareFirst Arena; 4,200
Wednesday, August 13	9:30 p.m.	New York	@	Las Vegas	ESPN	77–83	Meesseman (24)	Wilson (16)	Tied (5)	Michelob Ultra Arena; 10,417
Wednesday, August 13	10:00 p.m.	Atlanta	@	Seattle	ESPN3; League Pass	85–75	Ogwumike (29)	A. Gray (11)	R. Howard (7)	Climate Pledge Arena; 10,687
Friday, August 15	7:30 p.m.	Washington	@	Indiana	ION; League Pass	88–84	Citron (21)	Iriafen (12)	Mitchell (9)	Gainbridge Fieldhouse; 16,006
Friday, August 15	7:30 p.m.	Golden State	@	Chicago	ION; League Pass	90–59	Zandalasini (20)	Tied (6)	Salaün (6)	Wintrust Arena; 7,804
Friday, August 15	7:30 p.m.	Los Angeles	@	Dallas	ION; League Pass	97–96	Bueckers (29)	Hamby (10)	Allemand (10)	College Park Center; 6,116
Friday, August 15	10:00 p.m.	Las Vegas	@	Phoenix	ION; League Pass	86–83	Wilson (30)	Wilson (16)	Tied (9)	PHX Arena; 10,850
Friday, August 15	10:00 p.m.	WNBA Canada Game			ION; League Pass	80–78	Tied (21)	B. Jones (10)	Diggins (11)	Rogers Arena; 15,892
Friday, August 15	10:00 p.m.	Seattle	@	Atlanta	ION; League Pass	80–78	Tied (21)	B. Jones (10)	Diggins (11)	Rogers Arena; 15,892
Saturday, August 16	2:00 p.m.	New York	@	Minnesota	CBS	80–86	C. Williams (26)	Tied (10)	Cloud (6)	Target Center; 10,810
Sunday, August 17	1:00 p.m.	Indiana	@	Connecticut	NBA TV; League Pass	99–93 (OT)	Mitchell (38)	Boston (13)	Lacan (14)	Mohegan Sun Arena; 8,910
Sunday, August 17	3:00 p.m.	Los Angeles	@	Washington	ESPN3; League Pass	86–95	Hamby (26)	Iriafen (10)	Tied (7)	CareFirst Arena; 4,200
Sunday, August 17	3:30 p.m.	Dallas	@	Las Vegas	ABC; ESPN+	87–106	Wilson (34)	Tied (8)	C. Gray (14)	Michelob Ultra Arena; 10,418
Sunday, August 17	6:00 p.m.	Phoenix	@	Seattle	League Pass	85–82	Ogwumike (24)	Tied (10)	Thomas (11)	Climate Pledge Arena; 14,169
Sunday, August 17	8:30 p.m.	Atlanta	@	Golden State	NBA TV; League Pass	79–63	Burton (16)	B. Jones (9)	R. Howard (6)	Chase Center; 18,064
Tuesday, August 19	7:00 p.m.	Minnesota	@	New York	NBA TV; League Pass	75–85	J. Jones (22)	Tied (10)	Ionescu (11)	Barclays Center; 16,864
Tuesday, August 19	7:30 p.m.	Connecticut	@	Washington	League Pass	80–69	Citron (19)	Iriafen (12)	Sutton (7)	CareFirst Arena; 4,200
Tuesday, August 19	8:00 p.m.	Seattle	@	Chicago	League Pass	94–88	Diggins (24)	E. Williams (9)	Tied (6)	Wintrust Arena; 6,724
Tuesday, August 19	10:00 p.m.	Atlanta	@	Las Vegas	NBA TV; League Pass	72–74	Wilson (32)	Wilson (12)	C. Gray (11)	Michelob Ultra Arena; 10,420
Tuesday, August 19	10:00 p.m.	Phoenix	@	Golden State	League Pass	98–91	Copper (25)	Thomas (9)	Burton (14)	Chase Center; 18,064
Wednesday, August 20	10:00 p.m.	Dallas	@	Los Angeles	League Pass	80–81	Bueckers (44)	Hamby (9)	Allemand (8)	Crypto.com Arena; 13,598
Thursday, August 21	7:00 p.m.	Washington	@	Connecticut	League Pass	56–67	Charles (21)	Iriafen (10)	Sutton (6)	Mohegan Sun Arena; 7,144
Thursday, August 21	7:00 p.m.	Chicago	@	New York	Prime	91–85	J. Jones (25)	Cardoso (15)	Meesseman (6)	Barclays Center; 15,887
Thursday, August 21	7:30 p.m.	Minnesota	@	Atlanta	League Pass	73–75	A. Gray (27)	Shepard (16)	C. Williams (9)	Gateway Center Arena; 3,265
Thursday, August 21	10:00 p.m.	Phoenix	@	Las Vegas	Prime	61–83	Wilson (19)	Wilson (13)	Thomas (6)	Michelob Ultra Arena; 10,460
Friday, August 22	7:30 p.m.	Minnesota	@	Indiana	ION; League Pass	95–90	McBride (29)	Shepard (11)	Shepard (11)	Gainbridge Fieldhouse; 15,121
Friday, August 22	7:30 p.m.	Seattle	@	Dallas	ION; League Pass	95–60	Malonga (22)	H. Jones (10)	Tied (5)	College Park Center; 6,063
Friday, August 22	10:00 p.m.	Golden State	@	Phoenix	ION; League Pass	72–81	Akoa Makani (18)	Thomas (12)	Thomas (16)	PHX Arena; 10,280
Saturday, August 23	2:00 p.m.	New York	@	Atlanta	CBS	62–78	A. Gray (19)	Tied (8)	R. Howard (6)	Gateway Center Arena; 3,305
Saturday, August 23	3:00 p.m.	Las Vegas	@	Washington	League Pass	91–81	Wilson (36)	Iriafen (15)	Tied (8)	CareFirst Arena; 4,200
Saturday, August 23	4:00 p.m.	Connecticut	@	Chicago	CBS Sports Network	94–84	Tied (23)	Reese (11)	Mabrey (8)	Wintrust Arena; 8,412
Sunday, August 24	3:00 p.m.	Seattle	@	Washington	League Pass	84–82	Tied (30)	Malonga (10)	Diggins (11)	CareFirst Arena; 4,200
Sunday, August 24	4:00 p.m.	Golden State	@	Dallas	League Pass	90–81	Burton (25)	Tied (9)	Burton (13)	College Park Center; 6,251
Sunday, August 24	7:00 p.m.	Indiana	@	Minnesota	CBS Sports Network	84–97	Collier (32)	Collier (9)	C. Williams (10)	Target Center; 15,124
Monday, August 25	7:00 p.m.	Connecticut	@	New York	League Pass	79–81	Lacan (22)	Morrow (15)	Ionescu (9)	Barclays Center; 15,011
Monday, August 25	8:00 p.m.	Las Vegas	@	Chicago	NBA TV; League Pass	79–74	Atkins (30)	Reese (17)	Tied (7)	Wintrust Arena; 9,103
Tuesday, August 26	7:00 p.m.	Seattle	@	Indiana	CBS Sports Network	75–95	Boston (27)	Tied (9)	Diggins (8)	Gainbridge Fieldhouse; 16,737
Tuesday, August 26	10:00 p.m.	Phoenix	@	Los Angeles	NBA TV; League Pass	92–84	Hamby (25)	Thomas (16)	Thomas (15)	Crypto.com Arena; 10,726
Wednesday, August 27	7:30 p.m.	Las Vegas	@	Atlanta	NBA TV; League Pass	81–75	Wilson (34)	Hillmon (15)	Young (10)	Gateway Center Arena; 3,326
Wednesday, August 27	8:00 p.m.	Connecticut	@	Dallas	League Pass	101–95	Tied (22)	Morrow (11)	Tied (6)	College Park Center; 5,710
Thursday, August 28	7:00 p.m.	Washington	@	New York	Prime	63–89	Citron (18)	Stewart (9)	Talbot (6)	Barclays Center; 15,015
Thursday, August 28	8:00 p.m.	Seattle	@	Minnesota	League Pass	93–79	Diggins (23)	Tied (9)	C. Williams (10)	Target Center; 9,810
Thursday, August 28	10:00 p.m.	Chicago	@	Phoenix	Prime	79–83	Copper (28)	Reese (20)	Thomas (6)	PHX Arena; 10,445
Friday, August 29	7:30 p.m.	Dallas	@	Atlanta	ION; League Pass	78–100	R. Howard (24)	Tied (6)	Bueckers (10)	Gateway Center Arena; 3,268
Friday, August 29	10:00 p.m.	Indiana	@	Los Angeles	ION; League Pass	76–75	Boston (22)	Boston (11)	Stevens (5)	Crypto.com Arena; 15,419
Saturday, August 30	7:00 p.m.	Minnesota	@	Connecticut	NBA TV; League Pass	94–70	Tied (18)	Morrow (11)	McBride (6)	Mohegan Sun Arena; 8,910
Saturday, August 30	8:30 p.m.	Washington	@	Golden State	League Pass	62–99	Salaün (20)	Tied (6)	Leite (6)	Chase Center; 18,064
Saturday, August 30	9:00 p.m.	Chicago	@	Seattle	League Pass	69–79	Tied (20)	Tied (10)	Atkins (8)	Climate Pledge Arena; 12,500
Saturday, August 30	10:00 p.m.	New York	@	Phoenix	NBA TV; League Pass	63–80	Copper (22)	Mack (10)	Thomas (9)	PHX Arena; 13,252
Sunday, August 31	8:00 p.m.	Washington	@	Los Angeles	League Pass	78–81	Iriafen (22)	Iriafen (13)	Plum (7)	Crypto.com Arena; 12,218
Sunday, August 31	8:30 p.m.	Indiana	@	Golden State	NBA TV; League Pass	63–75	Rupert (21)	Tied (7)	Burton (13)	Chase Center; 18,064

September

Date	Time (ET)	Matchup			TV	Result	High points	High rebounds	High assists	Location
Monday, September 1	1:00 p.m.	Atlanta	@	Connecticut	League Pass	93–76	R. Howard (23)	B. Jones (11)	Hillmon (6)	Mohegan Sun Arena; 8,081
Monday, September 1	8:00 p.m.	Dallas	@	Minnesota	NBA TV; League Pass	71–96	Collier (25)	Tied (8)	Hiedeman (10)	Target Center; 10,824
Monday, September 1	10:00 p.m.	Los Angeles	@	Seattle	NBA TV; League Pass	91–85	Hamby (27)	Hamby (11)	Plum (7)	Climate Pledge Arena; 12,500
Tuesday, September 2	10:00 p.m.	New York	@	Golden State	League Pass	58–66	Tied (19)	Burton (9)	Burton (9)	Chase Center; 18,064
Tuesday, September 2	10:00 p.m.	Indiana	@	Phoenix	NBA TV; League Pass	79–85	Mitchell (29)	Mack (10)	Thomas (9)	PHX Arena; 13,132
Wednesday, September 3	7:30 p.m.	Los Angeles	@	Atlanta	League Pass	75–86	Hamby (21)	B. Jones (13)	Canada (10)	Gateway Center Arena; 3,265
Wednesday, September 3	8:00 p.m.	Connecticut	@	Chicago	League Pass	64–88	T. Charles (19)	Reese (13)	Mabrey (6)	Wintrust Arena; 7,195
Thursday, September 4	7:30 p.m.	Phoenix	@	Washington	Prime	75–69	Tied (18)	Iriafen (13)	Thomas (9)	CareFirst Arena; 4,200
Thursday, September 4	10:00 p.m.	Dallas	@	Golden State	League Pass	80–84	Bueckers (27)	Hines-Allen (11)	H. Jones (7)	Chase Center; 18,064
Thursday, September 4	10:00 p.m.	Minnesota	@	Las Vegas	Prime	87–97	Wilson (31)	Wilson (8)	C. Gray (10)	T-Mobile Arena; 14,656
Friday, September 5	7:30 p.m.	Los Angeles	@	Atlanta	ION; League Pass	85–104	R. Howard (37)	Tied (9)	Canada (8)	Gateway Center Arena; 3,314
Friday, September 5	7:30 p.m.	Chicago	@	Indiana	ION; League Pass	77–97	Mitchell (20)	E. Williams (11)	Mitchell (8)	Gainbridge Fieldhouse
Friday, September 5	10:00 p.m.	New York	@	Seattle	ION; League Pass	76–84	Stewart (24)	Ogwumike (9)	Diggins (7)	Climate Pledge Arena; 12,500
Saturday, September 6	1:00 p.m.	Phoenix	@	Connecticut	League Pass	84–87	Mabrey (23)	Morrow (13)	Thomas (10)	Mohegan Sun Arena; 8,910
Saturday, September 6	8:30 p.m.	Minnesota	@	Golden State	League Pass	78–72	Hiedeman (24)	Shepard (13)	Burton (6)	Chase Center; 18,064
Sunday, September 7	3:00 p.m.	Indiana	@	Washington	NBA TV; League Pass	94–65	Tied (17)	Boston (11)	Sims (8)	CFG Bank Arena; 11,183
Sunday, September 7	6:00 p.m.	Dallas	@	Los Angeles	NBA TV; League Pass	77–91	Allemand (21)	Hines-Allen (13)	Tied (7)	Crypto.com Arena; 13,868
Sunday, September 7	9:00 p.m.	Chicago	@	Las Vegas	NBA TV; League Pass	66–80	Wilson (31)	Cardoso (15)	Young (9)	T-Mobile Arena; 17,306
Monday, September 8	7:30 p.m.	Connecticut	@	Atlanta	League Pass	62–87	R. Howard (18)	Morrow (14)	Tied (6)	Gateway Center Arena; 3,319
Tuesday, September 9	7:00 p.m.	Washington	@	New York	ESPN3; League Pass	66–75	Meesseman (19)	J. Jones (11)	Ionescu (9)	Barclays Center; 17,532
Tuesday, September 9	7:30 p.m.	Minnesota	@	Indiana	ESPN	72–83	Mitchell (18)	Boston (8)	C. Williams (5)	Gainbridge Fieldhouse; 15,012
Tuesday, September 9	10:00 p.m.	Chicago	@	Las Vegas	League Pass	61–92	Tied (15)	Cardoso (13)	Young (7)	T-Mobile Arena; 15,640
Tuesday, September 9	10:00 p.m.	Los Angeles	@	Phoenix	NBA TV; League Pass	88–83	Hamby (25)	Thomas (11)	Thomas (10)	PHX Arena; 13,151
Tuesday, September 9	10:00 p.m.	Golden State	@	Seattle	League Pass	73–74	Salaün (22)	Tied (9)	Burton (11)	Climate Pledge Arena; 12,500
Wednesday, September 10	7:00 p.m.	Atlanta	@	Connecticut	League Pass	88–72	Mabrey (22)	Morrow (10)	Paopao (6)	Mohegan Sun Arena; 7,508
Thursday, September 11	8:00 p.m.	New York	@	Chicago	NBA TV; League Pass	91–86	M. Westbeld (25)	M. Westbeld (7)	Ionescu (11)	Wintrust Arena; 8,824
Thursday, September 11	8:00 p.m.	Phoenix	@	Dallas	League Pass	76–97	Bueckers (24)	Hines-Allen (10)	Bueckers (7)	College Park Center; 6,251
Thursday, September 11	8:00 p.m.	Golden State	@	Minnesota	League Pass	53–72	Hiedeman (21)	Shepard (14)	Burton (7)	Target Center; 8,824
Thursday, September 11	10:00 p.m.	Las Vegas	@	Los Angeles	NBA TV; League Pass	103–75	Wilson (23)	Wilson (19)	Young (12)	Crypto.com Arena

Notes:

- Games highlighted in represent Commissioner's Cup games.
- Game highlighted in represents the 2025 WNBA All-Star Game.
- Game highlighted in represents the 2025 WNBA Canada game.

=== All-Star Game ===
ABC

July 19, 2025
8:30 p.m. ET

Team Clark 131, Team Collier 151
Scoring by quarter: 36–49, 24–33, 35–37, 36–32
Pts: Kelsey Mitchell (20); Rebs: Kayla Thornton (11); Asts: Ionescu, Sykes (7)	Pts: Napheesa Collier (36); Rebs: Skylar Diggins (11); Asts: Skylar Diggins (15)

Gainbridge Fieldhouse
Attendance: 16,988
Referees: Tiara Cruse, Angel Kent, Jenna Reneau

=== Statistical leaders ===
The following shows the leaders in each statistical category during the 2025 regular season.

Stats current as of games on September 11, 2025

Category	Player	Team	Statistic
Points per game	A'ja Wilson	Las Vegas Aces	23.4 ppg
Rebounds per game	Angel Reese	Chicago Sky	12.6 rpg
Assists per game	Alyssa Thomas	Phoenix Mercury	9.2 apg
Steals per game	Gabby Williams	Seattle Storm	2.3 spg
Blocks per game	A'ja Wilson	Las Vegas Aces	2.3 bpg
Field goal percentage	Jessica Shepard	Minnesota Lynx	63.8%
Three point FG percentage	Sonia Citron	Washington Mystics	44.5%
Free throw percentage	Sabrina Ionescu	New York Liberty	93.3%
Points per game (team)		Minnesota Lynx	86.1 ppg
Field goal percentage (team)		Minnesota Lynx	47.2%

== Playoffs ==
=== Schedule ===
2025 WNBA playoffs
Round One

Date	Time (ET)	Matchup			TV	Result	High points	High rebounds	High assists	Location
Sunday, September 14	1:00 p.m.	Golden State	@	Minnesota	ESPN	72–101	Collier (20)	Shepard (8)	Burton (7)	Target Center; 8,821
Sunday, September 14	3:00 p.m.	Indiana	@	Atlanta	ABC	68–80	Mitchell (27)	Boston (12)	Boston (5)	Gateway Center Arena; 3,800
Sunday, September 14	5:00 p.m.	New York	@	Phoenix	ESPN	76–69 (OT)	Cloud (23)	J. Jones (12)	Thomas (8)	PHX Arena; 10,095
Sunday, September 14	10:00 p.m.	Seattle	@	Las Vegas	ESPN	77–102	Wilson (29)	Malonga (11)	Young (7)	Michelob Ultra Arena; 10,407
Tuesday, September 16	7:30 p.m.	Atlanta	@	Indiana	ESPN	60–77	Mitchell (19)	Tied (7)	Canada (6)	Gainbridge Fieldhouse; 16,682
Tuesday, September 16	9:30 p.m.	Las Vegas	@	Seattle	ESPN	83–86	Diggins (26)	Wilson (13)	C. Gray (9)	Climate Pledge Arena; 12,500
Wednesday, September 17	8:00 p.m.	Phoenix	@	New York	ESPN	86–60	Tied (15)	J. Jones (13)	Thomas (7)	Barclays Center; 17,017
Wednesday, September 17	10:00 p.m.	Minnesota	@	Golden State	ESPN	75–74	Collier (24)	Collier (7)	Burton (9)	SAP Center; 18,543
Thursday, September 18	7:30 p.m.	Indiana	@	Atlanta	ESPN2	87–85	Mitchell (24)	Tied (12)	Canada (10)	Gateway Center Arena; 3,800
Thursday, September 18	9:30 p.m.	Seattle	@	Las Vegas	ESPN2	73–74	Wilson (38)	Ogwumike (9)	C. Gray (8)	Michelob Ultra Arena; 10,409
Friday, September 19	9:30 p.m.	New York	@	Phoenix	ESPN2	73–79	Stewart (30)	S. Sabally (12)	Thomas (11)	PHX Arena; 13,104

Semifinals

Date	Time (ET)	Matchup			TV	Result	High points	High rebounds	High assists	Location
Sunday, September 21	3:00 p.m.	Indiana	@	Las Vegas	ABC	89–73	Mitchell (34)	Wilson (13)	Boston (5)	Michelob Ultra Arena; 10,409
Sunday, September 21	5:00 p.m.	Phoenix	@	Minnesota	ESPN	69–82	C. Williams (23)	Tied (9)	Tied (7)	Target Center; 10,121
Tuesday, September 23	7:30 p.m.	Phoenix	@	Minnesota	ESPN	89–83 (OT)	Tied (24)	Tied (9)	Thomas (13)	Target Center; 10,824
Tuesday, September 23	9:30 p.m.	Indiana	@	Las Vegas	ESPN	68–90	Wilson (25)	Boston (13)	C. Gray (10)	Michelob Ultra Arena; 10,516
Friday, September 26	7:30 p.m.	Las Vegas	@	Indiana	ESPN2	84–72	Young (25)	Hull (10)	C. Gray (6)	Gainbridge Fieldhouse; 16,507
Friday, September 26	9:40 p.m.	Minnesota	@	Phoenix	ESPN2	76–84	S. Sabally (23)	Thomas (9)	Thomas (8)	PHX Arena; 15,941
Sunday, September 28	3:00 p.m.	Las Vegas	@	Indiana	ABC	83–90	Wilson (31)	Boston (14)	Tied (9)	Gainbridge Fieldhouse; 16,022
Sunday, September 28	8:00 p.m.	Minnesota	@	Phoenix	ESPN	81–86	McBride (31)	Tied (8)	Thomas (10)	PHX Arena; 16,919
Tuesday, September 30	9:30 p.m.	Indiana	@	Las Vegas	ESPN2	98–107 (OT)	Wilson (35)	Boston (16)	Young (10)	Michelob Ultra Arena; 10,529

Finals

Date	Time (ET)	Matchup			TV	Result	High points	High rebounds	High assists	Location
Friday, October 3	8:00 p.m.	Phoenix	@	Las Vegas	ESPN	86–89	Tied (21)	Tied (10)	C. Gray (10)	Michelob Ultra Arena; 10,266
Sunday, October 5	3:00 p.m.	Phoenix	@	Las Vegas	ABC	78–91	Young (32)	Wilson (14)	C. Gray (10)	Michelob Ultra Arena; 10,404
Wednesday, October 8	8:00 p.m.	Las Vegas	@	Phoenix	ESPN	90–88	Wilson (34)	Wilson (14)	Tied (9)	Mortgage Matchup Center; 17,071
Friday, October 10	8:00 p.m.	Las Vegas	@	Phoenix	ESPN	97–86	Wilson (31)	Thomas (12)	Thomas (10)	Mortgage Matchup Center; 17,071

== Awards ==
On September 12, the league released an announcement schedule for the 2025 end-of-season awards.

=== Individual ===
Award		Winner	Team	Position	Votes/Statistic (Note: "Votes" listed are first-place votes, except as noted, although the winners for all WNBA awards apart from the statistically based Peak Performer Awards are determined by points earned rather than only first-place votes.)	Ref.
Most Valuable Player (MVP)		A'ja Wilson	Las Vegas Aces	Center	51 out of 72	
Finals MVP		A'ja Wilson	Las Vegas Aces	Center	N/A (Note: The WNBA did not announce detailed voting results.)	
Rookie of the Year		Paige Bueckers	Dallas Wings	Guard	70 out of 72	
Most Improved Player		Veronica Burton	Golden State Valkyries	Guard	68 out of 72	
Co-Defensive Player of the Year		Alanna Smith	Minnesota Lynx	Forward	29 out of 72 (each)	
Co-Defensive Player of the Year		A'ja Wilson	Las Vegas Aces	Center	29 out of 72 (each)	
Sixth Player of the Year		Naz Hillmon	Atlanta Dream	Forward	44 out of 72	
Kim Perrot Sportsmanship Award		Nneka Ogwumike	Seattle Storm	Forward	18 out of 72	
Dawn Staley Community Leadership Award		Tina Charles	Connecticut Sun	Center	N/A	
Peak Performers	Points	A'ja Wilson	Las Vegas Aces	Center	23.4 ppg	
Peak Performers	Rebounds	Angel Reese (Note: Reese did not meet the statistical minimum for this award for total games played but did qualify due to her total number of rebounds exceeding the statistical minimum set by the league.)	Chicago Sky	Forward	12.6 rpg	
Peak Performers	Assists	Alyssa Thomas	Phoenix Mercury	Forward	9.2 apg	
Coach of the Year		Natalie Nakase	Golden State Valkyries	Head Coach	53 out of 72	
Basketball Executive of the Year		Dan Padover	Atlanta Dream	General Manager	8 out of 14	
Business Executive Leadership Award		Jess Smith	Golden State Valkyries	President	N/A	

=== Team ===
Team		Members					Ref.
All-WNBA	First Team	A'ja Wilson	Napheesa Collier	Alyssa Thomas	Allisha Gray	Kelsey Mitchell	
All-WNBA	Second Team	Nneka Ogwumike	Jackie Young	Sabrina Ionescu	Aliyah Boston	Paige Bueckers	
All-Defensive	First Team	Napheesa Collier	Alanna Smith	Alyssa Thomas	Gabby Williams	A'ja Wilson	
All-Defensive	Second Team	Aliyah Boston	Veronica Burton	Rhyne Howard	Ezi Magbegor	Breanna Stewart	
All-Rookie Team		Paige Bueckers	Sonia Citron	Kiki Iriafen	Dominque Malonga	Janelle Salaün	

=== Players of the Week ===
Date Awarded	Eastern Conference		Western Conference		Ref.
Date Awarded	Player	Team	Player	Team	Ref.
May 28	Natasha Cloud	New York Liberty	Napheesa Collier	Minnesota Lynx	
June 3	Allisha Gray	Atlanta Dream	A'ja Wilson	Las Vegas Aces	
June 10	Kelsey Mitchell	Indiana Fever	Napheesa Collier (2)	Minnesota Lynx	
June 17	Allisha Gray (2)	Atlanta Dream	Kayla Thornton	Golden State Valkyries	
June 24	Shakira Austin	Washington Mystics	Nneka Ogwumike	Seattle Storm	
July 1	Angel Reese	Chicago Sky	A'ja Wilson (2)	Las Vegas Aces	
July 8	Not awarded				
July 15	Sabrina Ionescu	New York Liberty	Alyssa Thomas	Phoenix Mercury	
July 22	Not awarded				
July 29	Sabrina Ionescu (2)	New York Liberty	Dearica Hamby	Los Angeles Sparks	
August 5	Aliyah Boston	Indiana Fever	Kayla McBride	Minnesota Lynx	
August 12	Allisha Gray (3)	Atlanta Dream	A'ja Wilson (3)	Las Vegas Aces	
August 19	Kelsey Mitchell (2)	Indiana Fever	A'ja Wilson (4)	Las Vegas Aces	
August 26	Tina Charles	Connecticut Sun	A'ja Wilson (5)	Las Vegas Aces	
September 2	Rhyne Howard	Atlanta Dream	Alyssa Thomas (2)	Phoenix Mercury	
September 12	Rhyne Howard (2)	Atlanta Dream	A'ja Wilson (6)	Las Vegas Aces	

=== Players of the Month ===
Month	Eastern Conference		Western Conference		Ref.
Month	Player	Team	Player	Team	Ref.
May	Allisha Gray	Atlanta Dream	Napheesa Collier	Minnesota Lynx	
June	Allisha Gray (2)	Atlanta Dream	Napheesa Collier (2)	Minnesota Lynx	
July	Sabrina Ionescu	New York Liberty	Napheesa Collier (3)	Minnesota Lynx	
August	Allisha Gray (3)	Atlanta Dream	A'ja Wilson	Las Vegas Aces	

=== Rookies of the Month ===
Month	Player	Team	Ref.
May	Kiki Iriafen	Washington Mystics	
June	Paige Bueckers	Dallas Wings	
July	Paige Bueckers (2)	Dallas Wings	
August	Paige Bueckers (3)	Dallas Wings	

=== Coaches of the Month ===
Month	Coach	Team	Ref.
May	Sandy Brondello	New York Liberty	
June	Natalie Nakase	Golden State Valkyries	
July	Cheryl Reeve	Minnesota Lynx	
August	Becky Hammon	Las Vegas Aces	

== Coaches ==
=== Eastern Conference ===
Team	Head coach	Previous job	Years with team	Record with team	Playoff Appearances	Finals Appearances	WNBA Championships
Atlanta Dream	Karl Smesko	Florida Gulf Coast Eagles	0	0–0	0	0	0
Chicago Sky	Tyler Marsh	Las Vegas Aces (assistant coach)	0	0–0	0	0	0
Connecticut Sun	Rachid Meziane	Villeneuve-d'Ascq	0	0–0	0	0	0
Indiana Fever	Stephanie White	Connecticut Sun	2 (second stint)	37–31	2	1	0
New York Liberty	Sandy Brondello	Phoenix Mercury	3	80–36	3	2	1
Washington Mystics	Sydney Johnson	Chicago Sky (assistant coach)	0	0–0	0	0	0

=== Western Conference ===
Team	Head coach	Previous job	Years with team	Record with team	Playoff Appearances	Finals Appearances	WNBA Championships
Dallas Wings	Chris Koclanes	USC Trojans (assistant coach)	0	0–0	0	0	0
Golden State Valkyries	Natalie Nakase	Las Vegas Aces (assistant coach)	0	0–0	0	0	0
Las Vegas Aces	Becky Hammon	San Antonio Spurs (assistant coach)	3	87–29	3	2	2
Los Angeles Sparks	Lynne Roberts	Utah Utes	0	0–0	0	0	0
Minnesota Lynx	Cheryl Reeve	Detroit Shock (assistant coach)	15	330–180	13	7	4
Phoenix Mercury	Nate Tibbetts	Orlando Magic (assistant coach)	1	19–21	1	0	0
Seattle Storm	Noelle Quinn	Seattle Storm (associate head coach)	4	74–68	3	0	0

Notes:

- Year with team does not include 2025 season.
- Records are from time at current team and are through the end of the 2024 regular season.
- Playoff appearances are from time at current team only.
- WNBA Finals and Championships do not include time with other teams.
- Coaches shown are the coaches who began the 2025 season as head coach of each team.

== Attendance ==
Each team hosted a total of 22 games of their 44 regular season games during the 2025 season. Multiple teams moved some of their home games to larger arenas to accommodate for increased demand.

Average WNBA home game attendance
#	Team	Average attendance	Home arena capacity
1	Golden State Valkyries	18,064	18,064
2	Indiana Fever	16,560	17,274
3	New York Liberty	16,323	17,732
4	Los Angeles Sparks	12,441	19,079
5	Seattle Storm	11,835	18,300
6	Las Vegas Aces	11,553	12,000
7	Phoenix Mercury	11,306	17,071
8	Minnesota Lynx	9,958	18,798
9	Chicago Sky	9,073	10,387
10	Connecticut Sun	8,653	9,323
11	Dallas Wings	7,273	7,000
12	Washington Mystics	5,303	4,200
13	Atlanta Dream	4,480	3,500

== Media coverage ==
=== National ===
This was the ninth and final year of the broadcast agreement with ESPN, the third and final year of the agreement with Ion, and the second and final year of an agreement with CBS Sports and Amazon. New 11-year broadcast agreements with ESPN, Ion, CBS Sports, NBC Sports, USA Network, and Amazon will begin in 2026. Select games also aired on NBA TV through the WNBA and NBA's shared ownership.

- Ion Television aired 50 regular-season games, exclusively on Friday nights. Select games were showcased nationally with others only shown to regional audiences.
- NBA TV aired 40 regular-season games.
- ESPN aired 26 regular-season games across ABC, ESPN and ESPN2; half of which aired over-the-air on ABC. Select games were also streamed on ESPN+ and/or Disney+. Additionally, ESPN aired the 3-Point Contest and Skills Challenge, while ABC aired the 2025 WNBA All-Star Game. ABC, ESPN, and ESPN2 also exclusively aired the WNBA playoffs and WNBA Finals.
- CBS Sports aired 20 regular-season games, with eight airing on CBS and 12 airing on CBS Sports Network. For the first time, two games on CBS aired in primetime on Saturday nights. These were the first-ever primetime WNBA regular-season games on broadcast television, all CBS games were also available on Paramount+.
- Amazon Prime Video streamed 20 regular-season games, along with exclusive coverage of the championship game of the WNBA Commissioner's Cup.

=== Local ===
- In February 2025, the Chicago Sky announced an exclusive agreement with Weigel Broadcasting. The flagship station for these games was WCIU-TV.
- In February 2025, the Dallas Wings announced an exclusive agreement with Tegna Inc. The flagship station for these games was KFAA-TV.
- In March 2025, the Las Vegas Aces announced an exclusive broadcast agreement with Scripps Sports. The flagship station for these games was KMCC.
- In March 2025, the Seattle Storm announced an exclusive broadcast agreement with the Sinclair Broadcast Group. The flagship station for these games was KUNS-TV.
- In April 2025, the Golden State Valkyries, in its inaugural season, announced an exclusive agreement with CBS News and Stations. The flagship station for these games was KPIX-TV or KPYX.
- In the spring of 2025, the Atlanta Dream, with Gray Media, the New York Liberty, with Fox Television Stations, and the Indiana Fever, with Tegna Inc., announced extensions to their exclusive broadcast agreements.
- In May 2025, the Minnesota Lynx and FanDuel Sports Network North announced an agreement with Tegna Inc. to simulcast four games on KARE.
- In May 2025, the Indiana Fever launched Fever Direct with Endeavor Streaming to provide access to a maximum of 18 live regular season games and full game replays to fans in approved Midwest regions.
