= Janelle Salaün =

French basketball player (born 2001)

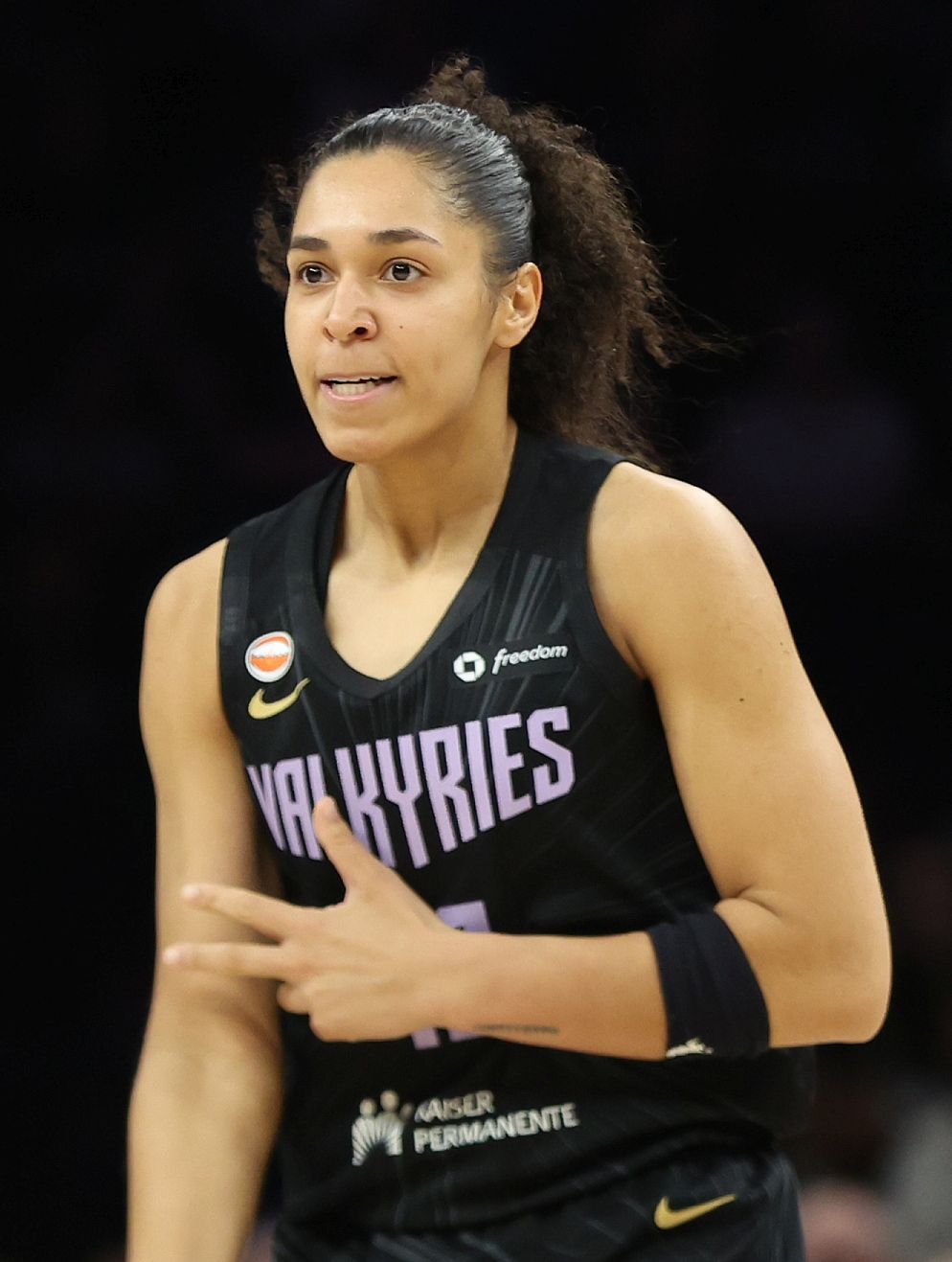
- Salaün with the Golden State Valkyries in 2026

No. 13 – Golden State Valkyries
- Position: Small forward / power forward
- League: WNBA

Personal information
- Born: 5 September 2001 (age 25) Paris, France
- Listed height: 6 ft 2 in (1.88 m)

Career information
- Playing career: 2019–present

Career history
- 2019–2020: Flammes Carolo
- 2020–2024: Villeneuve-d'Ascq
- 2024–2025: Famila Schio
- 2025–present: Golden State Valkyries
- 2025–2026: USK Praha
- 2026–present: Galatasaray

Career highlights
- WNBA champion (2026); WNBA Sixth Player of the Year (2026); WNBA All-Rookie Team (2025); Ligue Féminine champion (2024); Lega Basket Femminile champion (2025); Associated Press WNBA Sixth-Player of the year (2026)
- Stats at Basketball Reference
Medals
Women's basketball
Representing (France) France
Olympic Games
| Silver medal – second place | 2024 Paris | Team |
FIBA World Cup
| Silver medal – second place | 2026 Germany |
EuroBasket Women
| Bronze medal – third place | 2023 Israel/Slovenia |
U17 World Cup
| Silver medal – second place | 2018 Belarus |
U18 EuroBasket
| Bronze medal – third place | 2019 Bosnia and Herzegovina |
U16 EuroBasket
| Gold medal – first place | 2017 France |

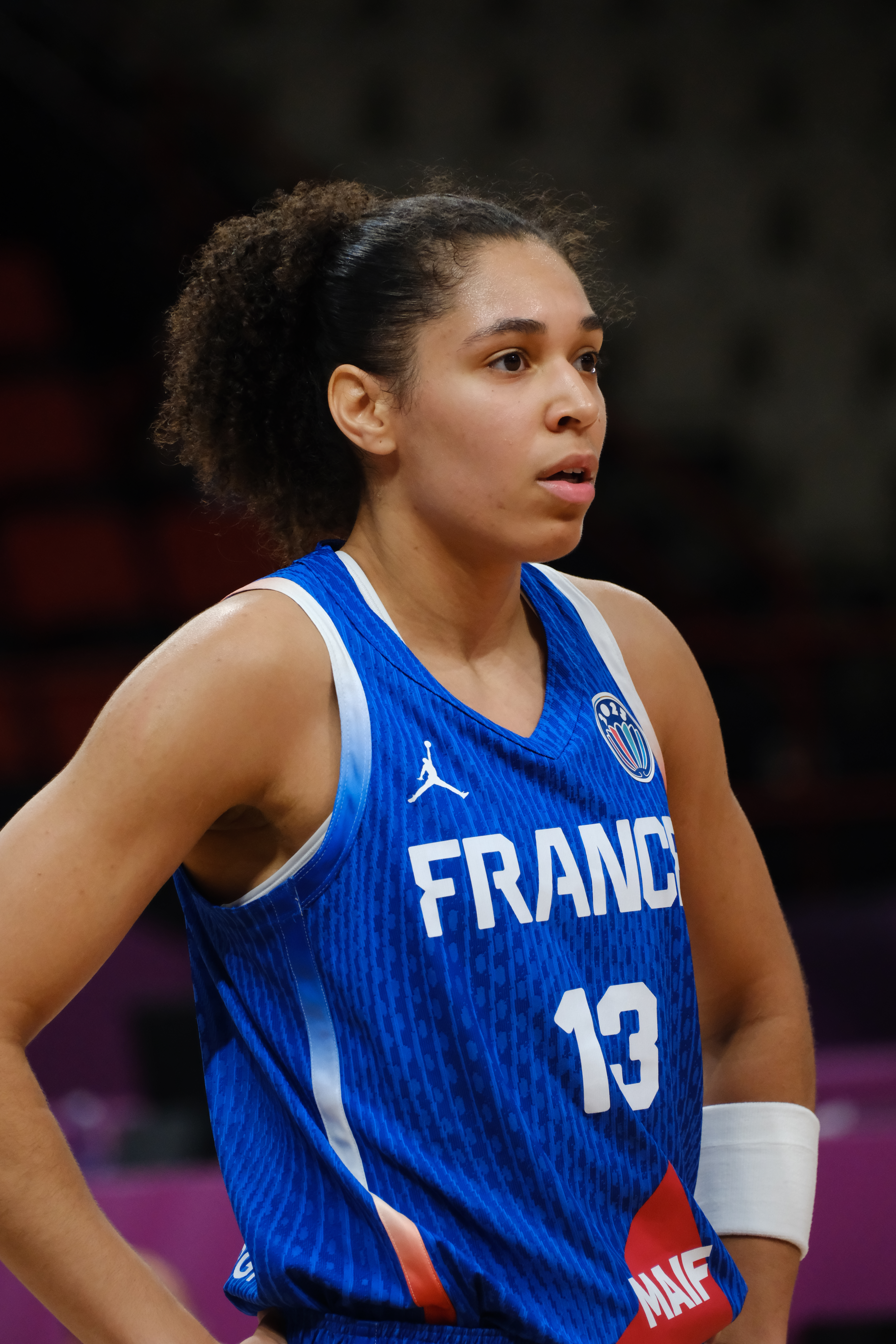

Janelle Illona Salaün (born 5 September 2001) is a French professional basketball player for the Golden State Valkyries of the Women's National Basketball Association (WNBA) and Galatasaray of the Turkish Super League. Salaün plays for the France women's national basketball team and was part of the French team at the 2024 Summer Olympics, where she won a silver medal.

== Professional career ==
=== Europe ===
Salaün trained at the Centre Fédéral, averaging 9.4 points, 7.7 rebounds in 27 minutes of play in Ligue 2 in 2018–2019, she signed her first professional contract with the Flammes Carolo. Disappointed with the lack of playing time, she joined Villeneuve-d'Ascq the following year. Salaün scored 17 points on 3 October 2021 against Charnay and 14 points on 2 December against Tarbes.

Her 2023–2024 season with Villeneuve-d'Ascq was very successful. Playing a major role in her team, Salaün managed to reach the EuroLeague final and won the national title in the LFB.

She joined Famila Schio of the Lega Basket Femminile for the 2024–2025 season. She helped the team win the league championship and was named Finals MVP, averaging 13.2 points, 5.4 rebounds, and 1.2 steals over the five-game series. Over the course of the season, she played in 30 games and averaged 13.5 points, 5.9 rebounds, and 1.8 assists in 27.3 minutes per game.

Salaün signed with USK Praha of the Czech Women's Basketball League for the 2025–2026 season.

On July 22, 2026, she signed a two-year contract with Galatasaray.

=== WNBA ===
==== Golden State Valkyries (2025–present) ====
On 5 February 2025, Salaün signed a training camp contract with the Golden State Valkyries of the Women's National Basketball Association. Although she missed training camp as she was finishing her season in Italy, she still made the final Valkyries roster.

Salaün was named to the WNBA All-Rookie Team in her first season. She ranked fourth among WNBA rookies in points per game (11.3), while also placing third in rebounds (5.1) and minutes (27.0) per game.

On 21 August 2026, Salaün broke the WNBA record for most points in a single season (458) by a reserve player when she scored 13 points off the bench in a 73-70 loss against the Chicago Sky.

On October 4th, Salaün made history as the first-ever unanimous WNBA Sixth Player of the Year.

== National team career ==
Salaün represented the France national under-16 team at the 2018 U16 European Championship, where she won a gold medal. She also won a silver medal at the 2018 U17 World Cup alongside Iliana Rupert and Marine Fauthoux.

With the U20 Euro 2021 cancelled for health reasons, FIBA organised the European Challengers in which Salaün stood out, notably against Poland with 26 points at 11/17 shooting success, including 2/4 at 3-pointers, 21 rebounds and 4 assists. France finished the Challenge undefeated with 5 wins and Salaün averaged 17.0 points at 57.9% shooting, 10.2 rebounds and 2.0 assists, in which she was named the tournament's MVP.

Salaün was part of the squad for the Paris Olympics tournament. She started in all 6 games during France's road to the silver medal, averaging 18.4 minutes, 6.0 points, and 3.0 rebounds per game.

== Player profile ==
A tall player trained as an interior, Salaün's mobility allows her to be a complete winger thanks to her good exterior address.

== Personal life ==
Salaün's parents both played basketball. Her brother Tidjane Salaün, plays for the Charlotte Hornets. She is of Guadeloupean descent.

== Orders ==
- Chevalier in the French Order of Merit: 2024

== Career statistics ==
Legend
| GP | Games played | GS | Games started | MPG | Minutes per game | RPG | Rebounds per game |
| APG | Assists per game | SPG | Steals per game | BPG | Blocks per game | PPG | Points per game |
| TO | Turnovers per game | FG% | Field-goal percentage | 3P% | 3-point field-goal percentage | FT% | Free-throw percentage |
| **Bold** | Career best | ° | League leader |

=== WNBA ===
==== Regular season ====
WNBA regular season statistics
| Year | Team | GP | GS | MPG | FG% | 3P% | FT% | RPG | APG | SPG | BPG | TO | PPG |
|---|---|---|---|---|---|---|---|---|---|---|---|---|---|
| 2025 | Golden State | 36 | **33** | **27.0** | .406 | .366 | **.806** | **5.1** | **1.2** | **.6** | **.1** | 1.5 | 11.3 |
| 2026 | Golden State | **40** | 0 | 22.1 | **.425** | **.392** | .796 | 4.0 | **1.2** | **.6** | **.1** | **.8** | **12.7** |
| **Career** | 2 years, 1 team | 76 | 33 | 24.4 | .416 | .381 | .800 | 4.5 | 1.2 | .6 | .1 | 1.1 | 12.1 |

==== Playoffs ====
| Year | Team | GP | GS | MPG | FG% | 3P% | FT% | RPG | APG | SPG | BPG | TO | PPG |
|---|---|---|---|---|---|---|---|---|---|---|---|---|---|
| 2025 | Golden State | 2 | 2 | 34.5 | .500 | .455 | .800 | 5.0 | .5 | .5 | .0 | 1.0 | 13.5 |
| **Career** | 1 year, 1 team | 2 | 2 | 34.5 | .500 | .455 | .800 | 5.0 | .5 | .5 | .0 | 1.0 | 13.5 |
