= WNBA Business Executive Leadership Award =

Women's National Basketball Association award

The WNBA Business Executive Leadership Award of the Women's National Basketball Association (WNBA) has been presented since the league's 2025 season.

The award recognizes a WNBA team president, nominated by their organization, who demonstrated exceptional leadership in driving meaningful business transformation.

Each team submits a business case for how the president, and their team, excelled across four key business transformation categories including people and culture, revenue generation, stakeholder engagement, and innovation. All submissions are reviewed and voted upon by a committee of league leadership, led by the league's Chief Growth Officer (currently Colie Edison).

== Winner ==
Year	Executive	Team	Ref.
2025	Jess Smith	Golden State Valkyries	
2026	Jennifer Rizzotti	Connecticut Sun	

== See also ==
- List of sports awards honoring women
