= Ohemaa Nyanin =

American basketball player and executive (born 1987)

Golden State Valkyries
- Position: General Manager
- League: WNBA

Personal information
- Born: Maryland, U.S.

Ohemaa Nyanin (born June 28, 1987) is a Ghanaian-American basketball executive, and the first ever General Manager of the WNBA's 2024 Expansion team the Golden State Valkyries. She oversees all aspects of basketball operations including hiring the coach, building the team, and player development.

Prior to being tapped to lead the WNBA's first new team since 2008, Nyanin spent five years with the New York Liberty as Director of Basketball Operations and then Assistant General Manager. She is widely cited as having been instrumental to recruiting Breanna Stewart, Courtney Vandersloot, and Jonquel Jones for the NY Liberty's 2023 season.

Nyanin worked for five years as assistant director of the Women's Basketball program at USA basketball, including at the 2016 Olympic Games and the 2018 FIBA Women's Basketball World Cup.

She played college basketball as a walk on at American University in Washington DC, where she studied international relations.
