= Jess Smith (basketball) =

American Basketball executive

Golden State Valkyries
- Position: President
- League: WNBA

Career information
- College: State University of New York at Oswego (BA); Ohio University (MSA)

Career highlights
- WNBA champion (2026); WNBA Business Executive Leadership Award (2025)

Jess Smith is an American basketball executive who is the President of the Golden State Valkyries of the Women's National Basketball Association (WNBA). Under her leadership, the Valkyries became the first women's pro sports franchise valued at $1 billion.

== Early life ==
After graduating from Auburn High School, Smith received a Bachelor of Arts degree in Journalism from State University of New York and a Master of Science degree from Ohio University.

== Career ==
Smith began her career with the Oakland Athletics of Major League Baseball from 2008 to 2015, in roles within ticketing and sponsorship. She then worked for the Columbus Blue Jackets of the National Hockey League from 2015 to 2016 as Director of Corporate Development. Smith next served as Vice President of Sponsorship for the San Jose Earthquakes of Major League Soccer from 2017 to 2020. Smith then joined Angel City FC of National Women's Soccer League, where she served as Head of Revenue since the team’s inception in 2020. In that role, she oversaw partnerships, ticketing, commerce, operations, data and analytics, broadcast and strategic alliances.

=== Golden State Valkyries ===
On February 14, 2024, Smith joined the Golden State Valkyries as the team's inaugural President. She was responsible for key decisions like developing a distinct visual identity based on the color violet instead of borrowing the Golden State Warriors' blue-and-gold, and targeting not just traditional Bay Area sports fans but also women's sports fans and a new demographic of "bright believers" focused on community, player empowerment, and local identity. In its first year, the franchise generated an estimated $78 million in revenue, and in its second year, it became the first women's pro sports team to generate $100 million in annual revenue, along with negotiating sponsorship deals with more than 40 brands. Following the 2025 season, Smith was named the recipient of the WNBA Basketball Executive of the Year Award.
