= 2025 WNBL Finals =

Women's National Basketball League Finals

| Team | Coach | Wins |
|---|---|---|
| Bendigo Spirit | Kennedy Kereama | 2 |
| Townsville Fire | Shannon Seebohm | 0 |
- Dates: 22 February – 9 March
- Season: 2024–25
- Teams: 4
- MVP: Sami Whitcomb (BEN)
- Semifinalists: Perth Lynx; Sydney Flames
- Matches played: 6
- Attendance: 15,168 (2,528 per match)
- All statistics correct as of 16 March 2025.

The 2025 WNBL Finals was the postseason tournament of the WNBL's 2024–25 season. The Southside Flyers were the defending champions, but they failed to qualify for Finals this season. The Bendigo Spirit won their third championship title after defeating Townsville, 2–0 in the Grand Final series. Sami Whitcomb was named Grand Final MVP and in doing so, Whitcomb became the first player since Lauren Jackson in 2003 to sweep a WNBL Championship, Season MVP, Finals MVP & Leading Scorer Award all in one season.

The WNBL Finals schedule was confirmed 18 February 2025, followed by the Grand Finals series schedule announced 28 February 2025.

== Overview ==
=== Finals appearances ===
- The Bendigo Spirit qualified for Finals for the first time since 2015, breaking a nine-season long drought from the WNBL Finals.
- The Perth Lynx qualified for Finals for the fourth consecutive season.
- The Townsville Fire qualified for Finals for the third consecutive season.
- The Sydney Flames qualified for Finals for the first time since 2018, breaking a six-season long drought from the WNBL Finals.
- The Canberra Capitals missed Finals for the third consecutive season.
- The Adelaide Lightning missed Finals for the third consecutive season.
- The Geelong United missed Finals for the first time since 2017 (previously competing as the Melbourne Boomers, prior to the teams licence transfer and relocation).
- The Southside Flyers missed Finals for the first time since 2022.

== Standings ==
| # | 2024–25 WNBL Championship ladder | | | | |
| # | Team | W | L | PCT | GP |
|---|---|---|---|---|---|
| 1 | Bendigo Spirit | 18 | 3 | 85.7 | 21 |
| 2 | Perth Lynx | 16 | 5 | 76.1 | 21 |
| 3 | Townsville Fire | 15 | 6 | 71.4 | 21 |
| 4 | Sydney Flames | 8 | 13 | 38.0 | 21 |
| 5 | Canberra Capitals | 8 | 13 | 38.0 | 21 |
| 6 | Adelaide Lightning | 7 | 14 | 33.3 | 21 |
| 7 | Geelong United | 6 | 15 | 28.5 | 21 |
| 8 | Southside Flyers | 6 | 15 | 28.5 | 21 |

== Bracket ==
Semi Finals
1 | Bendigo Spirit | 2
4 | Sydney Flames | 0
3 | Townsville Fire | 2
2 | Perth Lynx | 0

Grand Final
1 | Bendigo Spirit | 2
3 | Townsville Fire | 0

== Semi-Finals ==
=== (1) Bendigo Spirit vs. (4) Sydney Flames ===
23 February 2025
3:30 PM (AEDT)

Box Score

| Bendigo Spirit | 76–67 | Sydney Flames |
Scoring by quarter: 27–15, 24–13, 16–21, 9–18
| Pts: Whitcomb 24; Rebs: Griffin 12; Asts: Burton 4 | | Pts: Tupaea 16; Rebs: Morris 6 Asts: Brancatisano 4 |

Red Energy Arena, Bendigo, Victoria
Attendance: 1,514
Referees: Joshua Durand, Calia Hanks, Hugh Starkey

27 February 2025
7:00 PM (AEDT)

Box Score

| Sydney Flames | 74–91 | Bendigo Spirit |
Scoring by quarter: 31–23, 13–30, 23–20, 7–18
| Pts: Tupaea 24; Rebs: Pitman 7 Asts: George 6 | | Pts: Whitcomb 22; Rebs: Whitcomb 10; Asts: Whitcomb 6 |
Bendigo win series, 2–0

Quaycentre, Sydney, New South Wales
Attendance: 1,603
Referees: Madison Crowley-Long, Calia Hanks, Ruben Woolcock

Regular season series
Bendigo won 3–0 in the regular season series

13 November 2024

Box Score

Sydney Flames 71, Bendigo Spirit 90

Quaycentre, Sydney, New South Wales

2 January 2025

Box Score

Sydney Flames 71, Bendigo Spirit 92

Qudos Bank Arena, Sydney, New South Wales

12 January 2025

Box Score

Bendigo Spirit 80, Sydney Flames 62

Mildura Sporting Precinct, Mildura, Victoria

=== (2) Perth Lynx vs. (3) Townsville Fire ===
22 February 2025
5:00 PM (AWST)

Box Score

| Perth Lynx | 87–92 | Townsville Fire |
Scoring by quarter: 16–27, 20–16, 30–26, 21–23
| Pts: Wilson 32; Rebs: Maley 15; Asts: Wilson 9 | | Pts: Coffey 36; Rebs: Froling 8 Asts: Woods 10 |

Bendat Basketball Centre, Perth, Western Australia
Attendance: 1,496
Referees: Scott Bekker, Shannon Jennings, Jack Taylor

26 February 2025
6:30 PM (AEST)

Box Score

| Townsville Fire | 106–76 | Perth Lynx |
Scoring by quarter: 26–21, 28–19, 24–13, 28–23
| Pts: Ellis, Woods 18; Rebs: Cox 11; Asts: Ellis 9 | | Pts: Wilson 24; Rebs: Maley 6 Asts: Wilson 7 |
Townsville win series, 2–0

Townsville Entertainment Centre, Townsville, Queensland
Attendance: 3,004
Referees: Scott Beker, Brad Henshaw, Bianca Vernon

Regular season series
Perth won 2–1 in the regular season series

6 November 2024

Box Score

Perth Lynx 80, Townsville Fire 84

Bendat Basketball Centre, Perth, Western Australia

27 November 2024

Box Score

Perth Lynx 106, Townsville Fire 80

Bendat Basketball Centre, Perth, Western Australia

16 February 2025

Box Score

Townsville Fire 86, Perth Lynx 87

Townsville Entertainment Centre, Townsville, Queensland

== Grand Final ==
=== (1) Bendigo Spirit vs. (3) Townsville Fire ===
5 March 2025
7:00 PM (AEDT)

Box Score

| Bendigo Spirit | 70–60 | Townsville Fire |
Scoring by quarter: 16–23, 12–10, 13–8, 29–19
| Pts: Burton 24; Rebs: Griffin, Tolo 9 Asts: Burton 6 | | Pts: Ellis 17; Rebs: Cox, Woods 7 Asts: Cox, Froling 2 |

Red Energy Arena, Bendigo, Victoria
Attendance: 2,086
Referees: Scott Beker, Shannon Jennings, Jack Taylor

9 March 2025
2:00 PM (AEST)

Box Score

| Townsville Fire | 55–63 | Bendigo Spirit |
Scoring by quarter: 21–20, 13–13, 7–13, 14–17
| Pts: Cox 17; Rebs: Coffey, Fowler 7 Asts: Mansfield, Shiels 3 | | Pts: Whitcomb 26; Rebs: Griffin 10; Asts: Burton 9 |
Bendigo win series, 2–0

Townsville Entertainment Centre, Townsville, Queensland
Attendance: 5,465
Referees: Scott Beker, Shannon Jennings, Jack Taylor

Regular season series
Bendigo won 3–0 in the regular season series

16 November 2024

Box Score

Townsville Fire 76, Bendigo Spirit 84

Townsville Entertainment Centre, Townsville, Queensland

14 December 2024

Box Score

Bendigo Spirit 86, Townsville Fire 80

Red Energy Arena, Bendigo, Victoria

31 December 2024

Box Score

Townsville Fire 65, Bendigo Spirit 76

Townsville Entertainment Centre, Townsville, Queensland

=== Rosters ===
2024–25 Bendigo Spirit roster
Players
Coaches

| Pos. | No. | Nat. | Name | Ht. |
|---|---|---|---|---|
| F/C | 0 | (Australia) | Hannan, Ashlee | 1.92 m (6 ft 4 in) |
| F | 3 | (Australia) | Bird, Opal | 1.89 m (6 ft 2 in) |
| G | 5 | (Australia) | Simpson, Micah | 1.70 m (5 ft 7 in) |
| G | 6 | (United States) | Burton, Veronica (I) | 1.75 m (5 ft 9 in) |
| F | 10 | (Australia) | Nightingale, Asha (DP) | 1.87 m (6 ft 2 in) |
| C | 12 | (Australia) | Tolo, Marianna | 1.95 m (6 ft 5 in) |
| G | 13 | (Australia) | Wehrung, Abigail | 1.78 m (5 ft 10 in) |
| G | 14 | (Australia) | Booth, Georgia (DP) | 1.75 m (5 ft 9 in) |
| G | 16 | (Australia) | Samuels, Casey | 1.82 m (6 ft 0 in) |
| G | 22 | (Australia) | Wilson, Kelly | 1.70 m (5 ft 7 in) |
| F | 23 | (Australia) | Griffin, Kelsey (C) | 1.88 m (6 ft 2 in) |
| G | 32 | (Australia) | Whitcomb, Sami | 1.78 m (5 ft 10 in) |

Head coach

- (New Zealand) Kennedy Kereama

Assistant coach(es)

- (Australia) Deanna Black
- (Australia) Mat Holmes
- (Australia) Andrea Walsh
- (Australia) John White

Legend

- (C) Team captain
- (DP) Development player
- (I) Import player
- Injured

- Roster
Updated: 12 January 2025

2024–25 Townsville Fire roster
Players
Coaches

| Pos. | No. | Nat. | Name | Ht. |
|---|---|---|---|---|
| G | 1 | (South Sudan) | Lok, Nyaduoth | 1.80 m (5 ft 11 in) |
| G | 2 | (Australia) | Shiels, Saffron | 1.88 m (6 ft 2 in) |
| G/F | 7 | (Australia) | Woods, Courtney (C) | 1.83 m (6 ft 0 in) |
| F | 9 | (Australia) | Froling, Alicia (C) | 1.90 m (6 ft 3 in) |
| G | 11 | (United States) | Coffey, Nia | 1.85 m (6 ft 1 in) |
| F | 12 | (Australia) | Fowler, Alex | 1.88 m (6 ft 2 in) |
| F | 15 | (United States) | Cox, Lauren | 1.93 m (6 ft 4 in) |
| G | 23 | (Australia) | Ellis, Abbey | 1.68 m (5 ft 6 in) |
| G | 24 | (Australia) | McDowell-White, Jessica | 1.67 m (5 ft 6 in) |
| F | 30 | (Australia) | Cochrane, Lucy | 1.98 m (6 ft 6 in) |
| G | 33 | (Australia) | Mansfield, Lauren (C) | 1.70 m (5 ft 7 in) |

Head coach

- (Australia) Shannon Seebohm

Assistant coach(es)

- (Australia) Marcus Wong
- (Australia) Miles Bench

Legend

- (C) Team captain
- (DP) Development player
- (I) Import player
- Injured

- Roster
Updated: 15 March 2025
