= 2026 Golden State Valkyries season =

Second season of the Golden State Valkyries

- WNBA champions
- Head coach: Natalie Nakase
- Arena: Chase Center

Results
- Record: 32–12 (.727)
- Place: 2nd (Western)
- Playoff finish: WNBA Champions (defeated Atlanta Dream 4–3 in WNBA Finals)

The 2026 Golden State Valkyries season was the franchise's second season in the Women's National Basketball Association and second under head coach Natalie Nakase. The Valkyries defeated the Atlanta Dream in the 2026 WNBA Finals to claim their first title.

== Draft ==
Round	Pick	Player	Position	Nationality	College/Club	Outcome	Ref.
1	8	Flau'jae Johnson	G	United States	LSU	Traded to Seattle Storm, in exchange for (Spain) Marta Suárez (No. 16) and a 2028 second-round pick	
2	23	Ashlon Jackson	G	United States	Duke	Waived on May 2, 2026	
3	38	Kokoro Tanaka	G	Japan	(Japan) Eneos Sunflowers (W League)	TBA	

== Transactions ==
=== Front office and coaching ===
Date	Details	Ref.
January 22, 2026	Hired Denise Romero as Vice President of Basketball Operations	

=== Free agency ===
==== Re-signed / extensions ====
Player	Date	Notes	Ref.
(United States) Veronica Burton	April 11, 2026	Three-year deal	
(France) Iliana Rupert	April 12, 2026	Multi-year contract	
(France) Janelle Salaün	April 12, 2026	Multi-year contract	
(Italy) Cecilia Zandalasini	April 12, 2026	One-year deal	
(United States) Kayla Thornton	April 13, 2026	One-year contract	

==== Additions ====
Player	Date	Notes	Former Team	Ref.
(France) Gabby Williams	April 12, 2026	Multi-year deal	Seattle Storm	
(Lithuania) Justė Jocytė	April 12, 2026	Rookie contract activated (Unsigned 2025 draft pick – No. 5)	(Spain) Uni Girona CB (LF)	
(Greece) Mariella Fasoula	April 12, 2026	Training camp contract	(Turkey) Beşiktaş (Turkish Super League)	
(United States) Kiah Stokes	April 13, 2026	Multi-year deal	Las Vegas Aces	
(Australia) Miela Sowah	May 6, 2026	Player Development contract	(Australia) Townsville Fire (WNBL)	
(United States) Ndjakalenga Mwenentanda	May 8, 2026	Replacement contract	Vanderbilt	
(United States) Ashten Prechtel	May 10, 2026	Hardship contract	El Calor de Cancún (LNBPF)	
(France) Aminata Gueye	September 20, 2026	Rest-of-season hardship contract	USK Praha (Czech Women's Basketball League)	

=== Subtractions / unsigned ===
Player	Date	Reason	New Team	Ref.
(United States) Ashlon Jackson	May 2, 2026	Waived	Connecticut Sun	
(Spain) Marta Suárez	May 2, 2026	Waived	Phoenix Mercury	
(Greece) Mariella Fasoula	May 2, 2026	Waived	Toronto Tempo	
(France) Carla Leite	April 3, 2026	2026 WNBA expansion draft	Portland Fire (Selected 2026 expansion draft pick – No. 3)	
(Spain) María Conde	April 3, 2026	2026 WNBA expansion draft	Toronto Tempo (Selected 2026 expansion draft pick – No. 13)	
(United States) Monique Billings	April 11, 2026	Free agency	Indiana Fever	
(United Kingdom) Temi Fagbenle	April 14, 2026	Free agency	Toronto Tempo	
(United States) Kate Martin	May 7, 2026	Waived	Los Angeles Sparks	

== Roster ==
Golden State Valkyries roster
Players
Coaches

Pos.	No.	Nat.	Name	Height	Weight	DOB	From	Yrs
F	3	(Canada)	Amihere, Laeticia	6' 3" (1.91m)	185 lb (84kg)	2001-07-10	South Carolina	3
G	22	(United States)	Burton, Veronica	5' 9" (1.75m)	155 lb (70kg)	2000-07-12	Northwestern	4
G/F	6	(United States)	Charles, Kaila	6' 1" (1.85m)	168 lb (76kg)	1998-03-23	Maryland	5
G	2	(United States)	Chen, Kaitlyn	5' 9" (1.75m)		2002-02-22	Connecticut	1
C	31	(France)	Gueye, Aminata	6' 4" (1.93m)		2004-07-10	France	R
G	15	(Azerbaijan)	Hayes, Tiffany	5' 10" (1.78m)	155 lb (70kg)	1989-09-20	Connecticut	13
G/F	4	(Lithuania)	Jocytė, Justė	6' 2" (1.88m)		2005-11-19	Lithuania	R
F	11	(United States)	Prechtel, Ashten	6' 5" (1.96m)		2001-05-11	Stanford	R
C	12	(France)	Rupert, Iliana	6' 4" (1.93m)	189 lb (86kg)	2001-07-12	France	2
F	13	(France)	Salaün, Janelle	6' 2" (1.88m)		2001-09-05	France	1
G	7	(Australia)	Sowah, Miela	5' 10" (1.78m)	148 lb (67kg)	2000-06-04	Duke	R
C	41	(United States)	Stokes, Kiah	6' 3" (1.91m)	191 lb (87kg)	1993-03-30	Connecticut	10
F	5	(United States)	Thornton, Kayla	6' 1" (1.85m)	190 lb (86kg)	1992-10-20	UTEP	10
F	1	(France)	Williams, Gabby	5' 11" (1.8m)	172 lb (78kg)	1996-09-09	Connecticut	8
F	24	(Italy)	Zandalasini, Cecilia	6' 2" (1.88m)	175 lb (79kg)	1996-03-16	Italy	4

Head coach
(United States) Natalie Nakase (UCLA)
Assistant coaches
(United States) Kasib Powell (Texas Tech)
(United States) Sugar Rodgers (Georgetown)
(United States) Landon Tatum (Idaho)
Athletic trainer
(United States) Katelin Knox

Legend

- (C) Team captain
- (DP) Unsigned draft pick
- (FA) Free agent
- (S) Suspended
- Injured

WNBA roster page

East
ATL
CHI
CON
IND
NY
TOR
WAS
West
DAL
GS
LV
LA
MIN
PHO
POR
SEA

=== Depth chart ===
Pos.	Starter	Bench
PG	Veronica Burton	Kaitlyn Chen
SG	Kaila Charles	Justė Jocytė; Tiffany Hayes
SF	Gabby Williams	Cecilia Zandalasini
PF	Kayla Thornton	Janelle Salaün; Laeticia Amihere
C	Kiah Stokes	Iliana Rupert

== Schedule ==
=== Preseason ===
Golden State played one preseason game this year at the Chase Center.

2026 pre-season game log
Total: 1–0 (Home: 1–0; Road: 0–0)
April: 1–0 (Home: 1–0; Road: 0–0)

Game	Date	Team	Score	High points	High rebounds	High assists	Location Attendance	Record
1	April 25	Seattle	W 78–76	Burton, Sowah (14)	Kate Martin (7)	Burton, Chen (3)	Chase Center; 18,064	1–0

2026 pre-season schedule

=== Regular season ===
2026 game log
Total: 32–12 (Home: 17–5; Road: 15–7)
May: 5–3 (Home: 3–2; Road: 2–1)

Game	Date	Team	Score	High points	High rebounds	High assists	Location Attendance	Record
1	May 8	@ Seattle	W 91–80	Janelle Salaün (20)	Kayla Thornton (8)	Veronica Burton (6)	Climate Pledge Arena	1–0
2	May 10	Phoenix	W 95–79	Janelle Salaün (21)	Laeticia Amihere (6)	Veronica Burton (12)	Chase Center; 18,064	2–0
3	May 13	Chicago	L 63–69	Gabby Williams (18)	Kiah Stokes (11)	Veronica Burton (4)	Chase Center; 18,064	2–1
4	May 21	@ New York	W 87–70	Gabby Williams (16)	Laeticia Amihere (8)	Veronica Burton (7)	Barclays Center; 15,862	3–1
5	May 22	@ Indiana	L 82–90	Tiffany Hayes (19)	Charles, Stokes (7)	Burton, Williams (3)	Gainbridge Fieldhouse; 16,742	3–2
6	May 25	Connecticut	W 97–70	Gabby Williams (15)	Kayla Thornton (8)	Veronica Burton (6)	Chase Center; 18,064	4–2
7	May 28	Indiana	W 90–88	Veronica Burton (25)	Janelle Salaün (7)	Gabby Williams (6)	Chase Center; 18,064	5–2
8	May 31	Las Vegas	L 81–91	Gabby Williams (20)	Kiah Stokes (7)	Veronica Burton (5)	Chase Center; 18,064	5–3

June : 8–4 (Home: 7–1; Road: 1–3)

Game	Date	Team	Score	High points	High rebounds	High assists	Location Attendance	Record
9	June 2	Portland	W 95–77	Kayla Thornton (19)	Kayla Thornton (8)	Veronica Burton (9)	Chase Center; 18,064	6–3
10	June 4	@ Minnesota	L 84–87	Cecilia Zandalasini (18)	Hayes, Salaün, Thornton, Williams (5)	Kaitlyn Chen (5)	Target Center; 9,105	6–4
11	June 6	@ Las Vegas	L 79–84	Gabby Williams (27)	Kayla Thornton (9)	Burton, Charles, Hayes (3)	Michelob Ultra Arena; 10,467	6–5
12	June 9	Phoenix	W 87–81	Burton, Williams (25)	Kaila Charles (6)	Veronica Burton (8)	Chase Center; 18,064	7–5
13	June 12	@ Seattle	W 76–72	Janelle Salaün (22)	Janelle Salaün (7)	Veronica Burton (8)	Climate Pledge Arena; 10,648	8–5
14	June 15	Los Angeles	W 78–58	Gabby Williams (16)	Kaila Charles (8)	Kaila Charles (5)	Chase Center; 18,064	9–5
15	June 17	Dallas	W 91–80	Gabby Williams (25)	Kayla Thornton (11)	Veronica Burton (5)	Chase Center; 18,064	10–5
16	June 19	Minnesota	L 75–81	Cecilia Zandalasini (23)	Gabby Williams (8)	Veronica Burton (5)	Chase Center; 18,064	10–6
17	June 21	@ Las Vegas	L 73–92	Cecilia Zandalasini (12)	Kayla Thornton (5)	Kiah Stokes (3)	Michelob Ultra Arena; 10,350	10–7
18	June 24	Atlanta	W 77–66	Gabby Williams (23)	Amihere, Burton, Stokes, Thornton, Williams (5)	Veronica Burton (7)	Chase Center; 18,064	11–7
19	June 26	Atlanta	W 78–75	Gabby Williams (16)	Janelle Salaün (7)	Tiffany Hayes (5)	Chase Center; 18,064	12–7
20	June 28	New York	W 76–67	Kaila Charles (13)	Veronica Burton (6)	Veronica Burton (8)	Chase Center; 18,064	13–7

July : 6–2 (Home: 1–1; Road: 5–1)

Game	Date	Team	Score	High points	High rebounds	High assists	Location Attendance	Record
21	July 4	@ Atlanta	W 88–83	Veronica Burton (21)	Kaila Charles (8)	Kaila Charles (5)	Gateway Center Arena; 3,596	14–7
22	July 6	@ Washington	W 62–49	Kaitlyn Chen (14)	Kiah Stokes (9)	Kaitlyn Chen (4)	CareFirst Arena; 4,200	15–7
23	July 8	@ Toronto	W 83–75	Janelle Salaün (26)	Kayla Thornton (9)	Veronica Burton (6)	Coca-Cola Coliseum; 8,210	16–7
24	July 10	@ Connecticut	W 79–64	Veronica Burton (17)	Janelle Salaün (7)	Veronica Burton (6)	Mohegan Sun Arena; 8,546	17–7
25	July 15	@ Indiana	W 88–75	Gabby Williams (16)	Kayla Thornton (8)	Veronica Burton (4)	Gainbridge Fieldhouse; 17,014	18–7
26	July 18	Washington	W 74–69	Gabby Williams (18)	Amihere, Burton (5)	Veronica Burton (11)	Chase Center; 18,064	19–7
27	July 20	Washington	L 82–90	Kaitlyn Chen (20)	Kaila Charles (5)	Veronica Burton (7)	Chase Center; 18,064	19–8
All-Star Game
28	July 29	@ Phoenix	L 89–91	Cecilia Zandalasini (16)	Kaila Charles (10)	Burton, Hayes (5)	Mortgage Matchup Center; 10,152	19–9

August : 10–2 (Home: 4–1; Road: 6–1)

Game	Date	Team	Score	High points	High rebounds	High assists	Location Attendance	Record
29	August 2	Toronto	W 96–79	Janelle Salaün (24)	Kiah Stokes (11)	Veronica Burton (6)	Chase Center; 18,064	20–9
30	August 4	Toronto	W 92–81	Janelle Salaün (21)	Veronica Burton (8)	Veronica Burton (7)	Chase Center; 18,064	21–9
31	August 7	@ Dallas	W 94–76	Veronica Burton (22)	Kayla Thornton (10)	Veronica Burton (7)	American Airlines Center; 16,444	22–9
32	August 9	@ Los Angeles	W 84–78	Cecilia Zandalasini (15)	Stokes, Thornton, Zandalasini (7)	Veronica Burton (7)	Crypto.com Arena; 15,739	23–9
33	August 12	Chicago	W 91–71	Tiffany Hayes (22)	Burton, Hayes (6)	Tiffany Hayes (5)	Chase Center; 18,064	24–9
34	August 17	Dallas	W 78–70	Gabby Williams (23)	Gabby Williams (7)	Veronica Burton (5)	Chase Center; 18,064	25–9
35	August 19	Minnesota	L 66–77	Janelle Salaün (15)	Tiffany Hayes (7)	Veronica Burton (7)	Chase Center; 18,064	25–10
36	August 21	@ Chicago	L 70–73	Laeticia Amihere (16)	Tiffany Hayes (7)	Chen, Hayes (4)	Wintrust Arena; 8,028	25–11
37	August 24	@ Minnesota	W 80–66	Cecilia Zandalasini (18)	Kiah Stokes (9)	Veronica Burton (9)	Target Center; 16,001	26–11
38	August 26	@ Connecticut	W 89–64	Janelle Salaün (15)	Kaila Charles (8)	Veronica Burton (7)	Mohegan Sun Arena; 7,739	27–11
39	August 27	@ New York	W 79–60	Cecilia Zandalasini (20)	Kiah Stokes (9)	Veronica Burton (13)	Barclays Center; 17,579	28–11
40	August 30	@ Portland	W 86–69	Tiffany Hayes (18)	Kaila Charles (8)	Veronica Burton (6)	Moda Center; 15,146	29–11

September : 3–1 (Home: 2–0; Road: 1–1)

Game	Date	Team	Score	High points	High rebounds	High assists	Location Attendance	Record
41	September 18	Portland	W 82–66	Amihere, Chen (17)	Kiah Stokes (9)	Tiffany Hayes (7)	Chase Center; 18,064	30–11
42	September 19	Seattle	W 70–57	Kaila Charles (16)	Kaila Charles (12)	Tiffany Hayes (6)	Chase Center; 18,064	31–11
43	September 22	@ Portland	L 82–90 (OT)	Gabby Williams (17)	Burton, Stokes, Thornton (7)	Veronica Burton (8)	Moda Center; 14,815	31–12
44	September 24	@ Los Angeles	W 76–75	Kaitlyn Chen (18)	Kiah Stokes (12)	Veronica Burton (5)	Crypto.com Arena; 15,965	32–12

2026 season schedule

Notes:

- Games highlighted in represent Commissioner's Cup games.

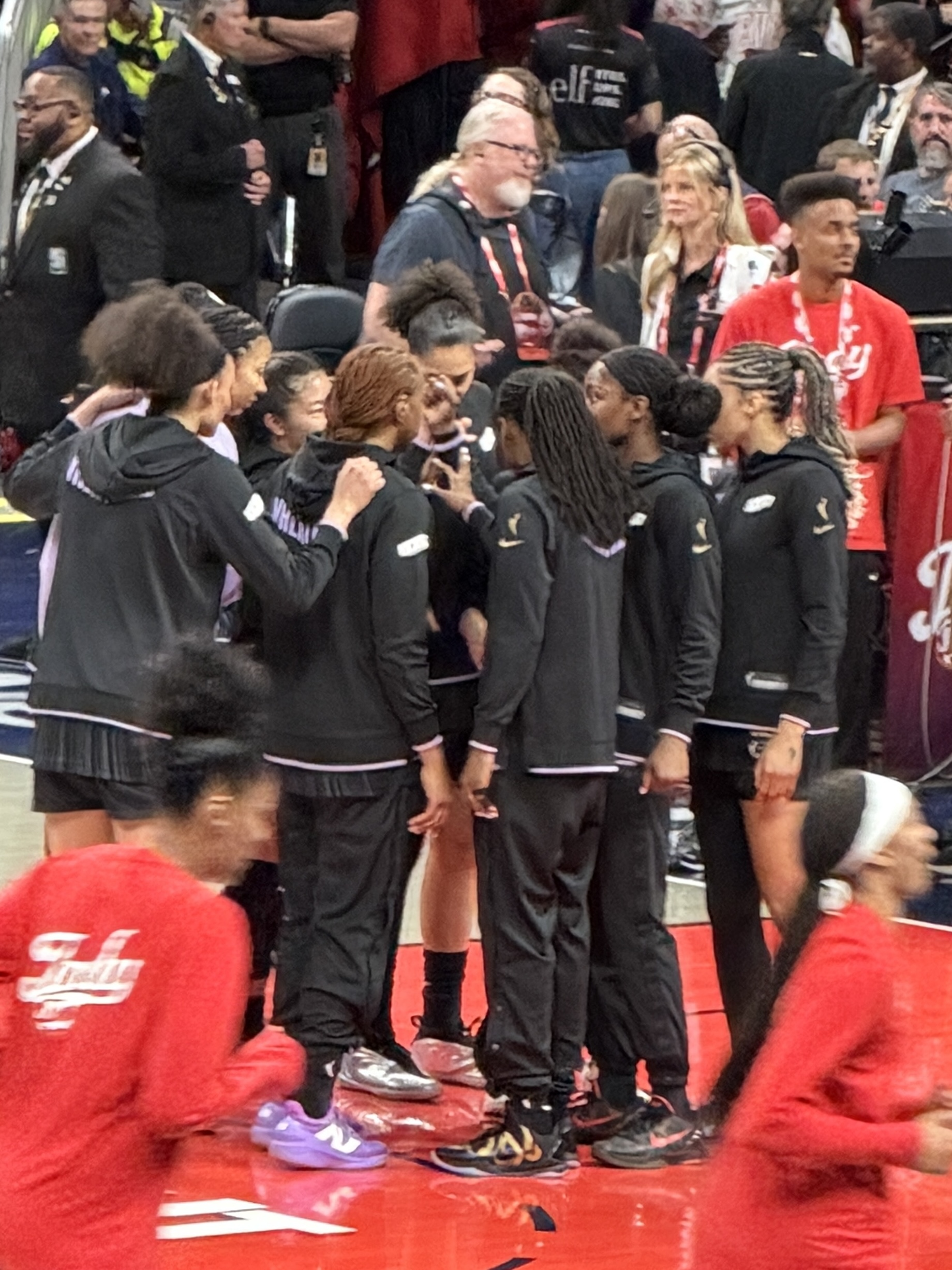
The Valkyries before an Indiana Fevers game in Indianapolis, Indiana in May 2026.

=== Playoffs ===
2026 playoff game log
First round vs. Dallas Wings
Won series: 2–1

Game	Date	Team	Score	High points	High rebounds	High assists	Location Attendance	Series
1	September 27	Dallas	W 104–80	Cecilia Zandalasini (23)	Kiah Stokes (8)	Veronica Burton (5)	Chase Center; 18,064	1–0
2	September 30	@ Dallas	L 100–108 (OT)	Gabby Williams (36)	Thornton, Williams (6)	Gabby Williams (7)	College Park Center; 6,251	1–1
3	October 2	Dallas	W 77–73	Gabby Williams (19)	Kiah Stokes (13)	Veronica Burton (6)	Chase Center; 18,064	2–1

Semifinals vs. Las Vegas Aces
Won series: 3–0

Game	Date	Team	Score	High points	High rebounds	High assists	Location Attendance	Series
1	October 4	Las Vegas	W 71–60	Gabby Williams (25)	Kiah Stokes (14)	Gabby Williams (5)	Chase Center; 18,064	1–0
2	October 7	Las Vegas	W 83–81	Tiffany Hayes (21)	Kiah Stokes (7)	Burton, Williams (3)	Chase Center; 18,064	2–0
3	October 9	@ Las Vegas	W 87–77 (OT)	Kayla Thornton (18)	Kiah Stokes (10)	Burton, Hayes (4)	Michelob Ultra Arena; 10,218	3–0

Finals vs. Atlanta Dream
Won Series: 4–3

Game	Date	Team	Score	High points	High rebounds	High assists	Location Attendance	Series
1	October 17	Atlanta	W 68–64	Gabby Williams (26)	Kaila Charles (10)	Tiffany Hayes (4)	Chase Center; 18,064	1–0
2	October 19	Atlanta	L 65–79	Hayes, Williams (14)	Kiah Stokes (11)	Chen, Hayes (3)	Chase Center; 18,064	1–1
3	October 21	@ Atlanta	L 71–97	Gabby Williams (15)	Kiah Stokes (11)	Gabby Williams (8)	State Farm Arena; 17,099	1–2
4	October 24	@ Atlanta	W 67–62	Gabby Williams (17)	Kiah Stokes (16)	Veronica Burton (5)	State Farm Arena; 17,099	2–2
5	October 26	Atlanta	W 64–55	Rhyne Howard (20)	Burton, Stokes (13)	Burton, Stokes (8)	Chase Center; 18,064	3–2
6	October 29	@ Atlanta	L 69–80	Gabby Williams (26)	Laeticia Amihere (10)	Veronica Burton (4)	State Farm Arena; 17,099	3–3
7	October 31	Atlanta	W 68–63	Gabby Williams (30)	Kiah Stokes (13)	Veronica Burton (5)	Chase Center; 18,064	4–3

2026 season schedule

== Standings ==
#	Team	W	L	PCT	GB	Conf.	Home	Road	Cup
1	y — Minnesota Lynx	33	11	.750	–	20–3	15–7	18–4	6–1
2	x — Golden State Valkyries	32	12	.727	1	15–8	17–5	15–7	5–2
3	x — Las Vegas Aces	31	13	.705	2	17–6	15–7	16–6	6–1
4	x — Atlanta Dream	30	14	.682	3	15–5	15–7	15–7	4–2
5	x — Washington Mystics	28	16	.636	5	15–5	15–7	13–9	3–3
6	x — Indiana Fever	28	16	.636	5	14–6	15–7	13–9	5–1
7	x — Dallas Wings	27	17	.614	6	13–10	16–6	11–11	4–3
8	cx – New York Liberty	26	18	.591	7	13–7	14–8	12–10	6–0
9	e — Portland Fire	17	27	.386	16	7–16	9–13	8–14	2–5
10	e — Phoenix Mercury	16	28	.364	17	10–13	7–15	9–13	2–5
11	e — Chicago Sky	16	28	.364	17	4–16	11–11	5–17	1–5
12	e — Los Angeles Sparks	16	28	.364	17	9–14	8–14	8–14	3–4
13	e — Toronto Tempo	11	33	.250	22	5–15	7–15	4–18	2–4
14	e — Connecticut Sun	11	33	.250	22	4–16	8–14	3–19	0–6
15	e — Seattle Storm	8	36	.182	25	1–22	6–16	2–20	0–7

Notes

(#) – League Standing
c – Commissioner's Cup winner
y – Regular season champion
x – Clinched playoff berth
e – Eliminated from playoff contention
Source: Overall standings and Commissioner's Cup Standings

== Playoffs ==
**First round** Best-of-3
1	Minnesota Lynx	0
8	**New York Liberty**	**2**
4	**Atlanta Dream**	**2**
5	Washington Mystics	0
2	**Golden State Valkyries**	**2**
7	Dallas Wings	1
3	**Las Vegas Aces**	**2**
6	Indiana Fever	1

**Semifinals**; Best-of-5
8	New York Liberty	0
4	**Atlanta Dream**	**3**
2	**Golden State Valkyries**	**3**
3	Las Vegas Aces	0

**Finals**; Best-of-7
4	Atlanta Dream	3
2	**Golden State Valkyries**	4

- **Bold** – Series winner
- Italic – Team with home-court-advantage
