= 2026 WNBA Finals =

Championship series of the 2026 WNBA season

| Team | Coach | Wins |
|---|---|---|
| Golden State Valkyries | Natalie Nakase | 4 |
| Atlanta Dream | Karl Smesko | 3 |
- Dates: October 17 – 31
- MVP: Gabby Williams
- Eastern finals: Atlanta Dream defeated New York Liberty 3–0 (Note: As of 2016, semifinal rounds are not divided by conference)
- Western finals: Golden State Valkyries defeated Las Vegas Aces 3–0

The 2026 WNBA Finals was the best-of-seven championship series for the 2026 season of the Women's National Basketball Association (WNBA). The series began on October 17 and ended on October 31, when the Golden State Valkyries defeated the Atlanta Dream four games to three to claim their first championship in franchise history. Golden State's Gabby Williams was named the WNBA Finals Most Valuable Player.

It was the first WNBA Finals and first WNBA playoff series of any kind to go to a game seven. In their second season of play, Golden State's victory made them one of the fastest North American expansion teams to win a championship.

== Road to the Finals ==
=== Standings ===
| # | Team | W | L | PCT | GB | Conf. | Home | Road | Cup |
|---|---|---|---|---|---|---|---|---|---|
| 1 | **y** — Minnesota Lynx | 33 | 11 | .750 | – | 20–3 | 15–7 | 18–4 | 6–1 |
| 2 | **x** — Golden State Valkyries | 32 | 12 | .727 | 1 | 15–8 | 17–5 | 15–7 | 5–2 |
| 3 | **x** — Las Vegas Aces | 31 | 13 | .705 | 2 | 17–6 | 15–7 | 16–6 | 6–1 |
| 4 | **x** — Atlanta Dream | 30 | 14 | .682 | 3 | 15–5 | 15–7 | 15–7 | 4–2 |
| 5 | **x** — Washington Mystics | 28 | 16 | .636 | 5 | 15–5 | 15–7 | 13–9 | 3–3 |
| 6 | **x** — Indiana Fever | 28 | 16 | .636 | 5 | 14–6 | 15–7 | 13–9 | 5–1 |
| 7 | **x** — Dallas Wings | 27 | 17 | .614 | 6 | 13–10 | 16–6 | 11–11 | 4–3 |
| 8 | **cx** – New York Liberty | 26 | 18 | .591 | 7 | 13–7 | 14–8 | 12–10 | 6–0 |
| 9 | **e** — Portland Fire | 17 | 27 | .386 | 16 | 7–16 | 9–13 | 8–14 | 2–5 |
| 10 | **e** — Phoenix Mercury | 16 | 28 | .364 | 17 | 10–13 | 7–15 | 9–13 | 2–5 |
| 11 | **e** — Chicago Sky | 16 | 28 | .364 | 17 | 4–16 | 11–11 | 5–17 | 1–5 |
| 12 | **e** — Los Angeles Sparks | 16 | 28 | .364 | 17 | 9–14 | 8–14 | 8–14 | 3–4 |
| 13 | **e** — Toronto Tempo | 11 | 33 | .250 | 22 | 5–15 | 7–15 | 4–18 | 2–4 |
| 14 | **e** — Connecticut Sun | 11 | 33 | .250 | 22 | 4–16 | 8–14 | 3–19 | 0–6 |
| 15 | **e** — Seattle Storm | 8 | 36 | .182 | 25 | 1–22 | 6–16 | 2–20 | 0–7 |

Notes

(#) – League Standing
c – Commissioner's Cup winner
y – Regular season champion
x – Clinched playoff berth
e – Eliminated from playoff contention
Source: Overall standings and Commissioner's Cup Standings

=== Playoffs ===
**First round** Best-of-3
1 | Minnesota Lynx | 0
8 | **New York Liberty** | **2**
4 | **Atlanta Dream** | **2**
5 | Washington Mystics | 0
2 | **Golden State Valkyries** | **2**
7 | Dallas Wings | 1
3 | **Las Vegas Aces** | **2**
6 | Indiana Fever | 1

**Semifinals**; Best-of-5
8 | New York Liberty | 0
4 | **Atlanta Dream** | **3**
2 | **Golden State Valkyries** | **3**
3 | Las Vegas Aces | 0

**Finals**; Best-of-7
4 | Atlanta Dream | 3
2 | **Golden State Valkyries** | **4**

- **Bold** – Series winner
- Italic – Team with home-court-advantage

In November 2021, the WNBA board of governors formalized a new playoff system that would structure the 2022 playoffs onward. The new playoff format also scraps the single-elimination games of the first two rounds in favor of a best-of-3 quarterfinal round. As a result, all eight playoff teams, seeded according to overall regular season record regardless of conference (1 vs. 8, 2 vs. 7, 3 vs. 6, 4 vs. 5), will begin postseason play in the first round. Since 2016, seeds 3 and 4 received a bye to the second round (single game) and seeds 1 and 2 received a bye to the semifinals (best-of-5). In the first round series, the higher seeded team will host games 1 and 2, and the lower seeded team will host game 3 if necessary. Then in the semifinal round, no reseeding will take place, which means the winners of the 1 vs. 8 series will be paired with the winner of the 4 vs. 5 series as will the winners of the 2 vs. 7 and 3 vs. 6 series. The semifinal will be the best-of-5 series in which the higher seeded team hosts games 1, 2 and (if necessary) 5 while the lower seeded team hosts games 3 and (if necessary) 4. The 2026 Finals are the second to be held with a best-of-seven format and first to achieve that in league history.

The advancement of the Dream to the Finals set up a scheduling snag due to the fact that Games 3, 4 and 6 would conflict with previously scheduled events at State Farm Arena, which the Dream had used to host for their previous playoff round games; Gateway Center Arena, which the Dream used for their final season before intending to use State Farm Arena on a full-time basis in 2027, was the intended location for Game 3 and 4. Days before the Finals, the league reached a resolution to change the date of Game 3 from October 22 to October 21 and move the time of Game 4 to 1:00 pm EDT (the Atlanta Hawks, who have no partnership with the Dream, agreed to move their game time 30 minutes later). The WNBA announced on October 26 that Game 6 will also be hosted at State Farm Arena on October 29, but at 12:30 pm EDT, and a potential championship trophy presentation and celebration would have to be instead held at a practice gym so arena crews could get the court ready for the Hawks game later that night (despite the Hawks still agreeing to move their game time an hour later). This decision was criticized for choosing State Farm Arena's capacity at the expense of a potentially higher primetime viewership for a championship-clinching game, it would be 9:30 am PDT in the morning for Valkyries fans trying to watch from California, and no guarantee that a Thursday afternoon game scheduled at such a relatively short notice would generate the same level of attendance in Atlanta. The Dream issued a statement prior to Game 6 saying that the team attempted to warn WNBA officials months earlier about the potential scheduling conflicts but the concerns went largely ignored.

== Summary ==
=== Game 1 ===
NBC

October 17
3:30 PM ET

Recap

Atlanta Dream 64, Golden State Valkyries 68
Scoring by quarter: 22–14, 17–28, 17–9, 8–17
| Pts: Allisha Gray 19; Rebs: Angel Reese 12; Asts: Jordin Canada 7 | Pts: Gabby Williams 26; Rebs: Kaila Charles 10; Asts: Tiffany Hayes 4 |
Golden State leads series, 1–0

Chase Center
Attendance: 18,064
Referees: Randy Richardson, Ashley Gloss, Maj Forsberg

=== Game 2 ===
USA Network

October 19
8 PM ET

Recap

Atlanta Dream 79, Golden State Valkyries 65
Scoring by quarter: 18–21, 21–16, 21–9, 19–19
| Pts: Angel Reese 30; Rebs: Angel Reese 16; Asts: Jordin Canada 10 | Pts: Hayes, Williams 14; Rebs: Kiah Stokes 11; Asts: Chen, Hayes 3 |
Series tied, 1–1

Chase Center
Attendance: 18,064
Referees: Tiara Cruse, Angel Kent, Kevin Fahy

This marked the first WNBA Finals win for the Dream (they were previously 0–10 in Finals games).

=== Game 3 ===
USA Network

October 21
8 PM ET

Recap

Golden State Valkyries 71, Atlanta Dream 97
Scoring by quarter: 15–23, 25–23, 17–25, 14–26
| Pts: Gabby Williams 15; Rebs: Kiah Stokes 11; Asts: Gabby Williams 8 | Pts: Angel Reese 21; Rebs: Angel Reese 12; Asts: Jordin Canada 8 |
Atlanta leads series, 2–1

State Farm Arena
Attendance: 17,099
Referees: Fatou Cissoko-Stephens, Ryan Sassano, Amy Bonner

This marked the first WNBA Finals home win for Atlanta after the Dream held the Valkyries' starters to 33 total points.

=== Game 4 ===
NBC

October 24
1 PM ET

Recap

Golden State Valkyries 67, Atlanta Dream 62
Scoring by quarter: 16–11, 26–15, 12–19, 13–17
| Pts: Gabby Williams 17; Rebs: Kiah Stokes 16; Asts: Veronica Burton 5 | Pts: Rhyne Howard 19; Rebs: Hillmon, Reese 9 Asts: Jordin Canada 4 |
Series tied, 2–2

State Farm Arena
Attendance: 17,099
Referees: Roy Gulbeyan, Timothy Greene, Marcy Williams

=== Game 5 ===
USA Network

October 26
8 PM ET

Recap

Atlanta Dream 55, Golden State Valkyries 64
Scoring by quarter: 14–13, 8–12, 18–21, 15–18
| Pts: Rhyne Howard 20; Rebs: Angel Reese 15; Asts: Canada, Reese 5 | Pts: Burton, Stokes 13; Rebs: Burton, Stokes 8 Asts: Kaila Charles 4 |
Golden State leads series, 3–2

Chase Center
Attendance: 18,064
Referees: Tiara Cruse, Randy Richardson, Angel Kent

=== Game 6 ===
USA Network

October 29
12:30 PM ET

Recap

Golden State Valkyries 69, Atlanta Dream 80
Scoring by quarter: 15–32, 11–14, 21–17, 22–17
| Pts: Gabby Williams 26; Rebs: Laeticia Amihere 10; Asts: Veronica Burton 4 | Pts: Allisha Gray 23; Rebs: Angel Reese 14; Asts: Angel Reese 6 |
Series tied, 3–3

State Farm Arena
Attendance: 17,099
Referees: Fatou Cissoko-Stephens, Ashley Gloss, Ryan Sassano

The Dream came back to force a Game 7, the first in WNBA history, behind Angel Reese’s 14 rebounds and 6 assists.

=== Game 7 ===
USA Network

October 31
8 PM ET

Recap

Atlanta Dream 63, Golden State Valkyries 68
Scoring by quarter: 12–14, 18—10, 14–21, 19–23
| Pts: Jordin Canada 18; Rebs: Angel Reese 12; Asts: Jordin Canada 5 | Pts: Gabby Williams 30; Rebs: Kiah Stokes 13; Asts: Veronica Burton 5 |
Golden State wins series, 4–3

Chase Center
Attendance: 18,064
Referees: Roy Gulbeyan, Tiara Cruse, Timothy Greene

== Team rosters ==
Golden State Valkyries roster
Players
Coaches

| Pos. | No. | Nat. | Name | Height | Weight | DOB | From | Yrs |
|---|---|---|---|---|---|---|---|---|
| F | 3 | (Canada) | Amihere, Laeticia | 6' 3" (1.91m) | 185 lb (84kg) | 2001-07-10 | South Carolina | 3 |
| G | 22 | (United States) | Burton, Veronica | 5' 9" (1.75m) | 155 lb (70kg) | 2000-07-12 | Northwestern | 4 |
| G/F | 6 | (United States) | Charles, Kaila | 6' 1" (1.85m) | 168 lb (76kg) | 1998-03-23 | Maryland | 5 |
| G | 2 | (United States) | Chen, Kaitlyn | 5' 9" (1.75m) | | 2002-02-22 | Connecticut | 1 |
| C | 31 | (France) | Gueye, Aminata | 6' 4" (1.93m) | | 2004-07-10 | France | R |
| G | 15 | (Azerbaijan) | Hayes, Tiffany | 5' 10" (1.78m) | 155 lb (70kg) | 1989-09-20 | Connecticut | 13 |
| G/F | 4 | (Lithuania) | Jocytė, Justė | 6' 2" (1.88m) | | 2005-11-19 | Lithuania | R |
| F | 11 | (United States) | Prechtel, Ashten | 6' 5" (1.96m) | | 2001-05-11 | Stanford | R |
| C | 12 | (France) | Rupert, Iliana | 6' 4" (1.93m) | 189 lb (86kg) | 2001-07-12 | France | 2 |
| F | 13 | (France) | Salaün, Janelle | 6' 2" (1.88m) | | 2001-09-05 | France | 1 |
| G | 7 | (Australia) | Sowah, Miela | 5' 10" (1.78m) | 148 lb (67kg) | 2000-06-04 | Duke | R |
| C | 41 | (United States) | Stokes, Kiah | 6' 3" (1.91m) | 191 lb (87kg) | 1993-03-30 | Connecticut | 10 |
| F | 5 | (United States) | Thornton, Kayla | 6' 1" (1.85m) | 190 lb (86kg) | 1992-10-20 | UTEP | 10 |
| F | 1 | (France) | Williams, Gabby | 5' 11" (1.8m) | 172 lb (78kg) | 1996-09-09 | Connecticut | 8 |
| F | 24 | (Italy) | Zandalasini, Cecilia | 6' 2" (1.88m) | 175 lb (79kg) | 1996-03-16 | Italy | 4 |

Head coach
(United States) Natalie Nakase (UCLA)
Assistant coaches
(United States) Kasib Powell (Texas Tech)
(United States) Sugar Rodgers (Georgetown)
(United States) Landon Tatum (Idaho)
Athletic trainer
(United States) Katelin Knox

Legend

- (C) Team captain
- (DP) Unsigned draft pick
- (FA) Free agent
- (S) Suspended
- Injured

WNBA roster page

East
ATL
CHI
CON
IND
NY
TOR
WAS
West
DAL
GS
LV
LA
MIN
PHO
POR
SEA

=== Depth chart ===
| Pos. | Starter | Bench |
|---|---|---|
| PG | Veronica Burton | Kaitlyn Chen |
| SG | Kaila Charles | Justė Jocytė; Tiffany Hayes |
| SF | Gabby Williams | Cecilia Zandalasini |
| PF | Kayla Thornton | Janelle Salaün; Laeticia Amihere |
| C | Kiah Stokes | Iliana Rupert |

Atlanta Dream roster
Players
Coaches

| Pos. | No. | Nat. | Name | Height | Weight | DOB | From | Yrs |
|---|---|---|---|---|---|---|---|---|
| G/F | 24 | (North Macedonia) | Bonner, DeWanna | 6' 4" (1.93m) | 140 lb (64kg) | 1987-08-21 | Auburn | 16 |
| G | 20 | (Australia) | Borlase, Isobel | 5' 11" (1.8m) | | 2004-09-12 | Lake Ginninderra | R |
| G | 3 | (United States) | Canada, Jordin | 5' 6" (1.68m) | 135 lb (61kg) | 1995-08-11 | UCLA | 8 |
| G | 15 | (United States) | Gray, Allisha | 6' 0" (1.83m) | 167 lb (76kg) | 1995-01-12 | South Carolina | 9 |
| F | 00 | (United States) | Hillmon, Naz | 6' 2" (1.88m) | 190 lb (86kg) | 2000-04-05 | Michigan | 4 |
| F | 10 | (United States) | Howard, Rhyne | 6' 2" (1.88m) | 175 lb (79kg) | 2000-04-29 | Kentucky | 4 |
| C | 42 | (United States) | Jones, Brionna (injured) | 6' 3" (1.91m) | 215 lb (98kg) | 1995-12-18 | Maryland | 9 |
| F | 23 | (Mali) | Koné, Sika | 6' 3" (1.91m) | 180 lb (82kg) | 2002-07-13 | Mali | 3 |
| G | 21 | (United States) | Nivar, Indya | 5' 10" (1.78m) | | 2004-01-16 | North Carolina | R |
| C | 11 | (Kenya) | Okot, Madina | 6' 6" (1.98m) | | 2004-08-23 | South Carolina | R |
| G | 2 | (United States) | Paopao, Te-Hina | 5' 9" (1.75m) | | 2002-08-21 | South Carolina | 1 |
| F | 5 | (United States) | Reese, Angel | 6' 4" (1.93m) | 165 lb (75kg) | 2002-05-06 | LSU | 2 |
| G | 0 | (Italy) | Villa, Matilde | 5' 7" (1.7m) | 140 lb (64kg) | 2004-12-09 | Italy | R |
| G | 33 | (United States) | Walker-Kimbrough, Shatori | 5' 9" (1.75m) | 140 lb (64kg) | 1995-05-18 | Maryland | 9 |

Head coach
(United States) Karl Smesko (Kent State)
Assistant coaches
(United States) Camryn Brown (High Point)
(United States) Chelsea Lyles (Florida Gulf Coast)
(United States) Brandi Poole (Sewanee)
(United States) LaToya Sanders (North Carolina)
Athletic trainer
(United States) Katie Buria (Arkansas)

Legend

- (C) Team captain
- (DP) Unsigned draft pick
- (FA) Free agent
- (S) Suspended
- Injured

WNBA roster page

East
ATL
CHI
CON
IND
NY
TOR
WAS
West
DAL
GS
LV
LA
MIN
PHO
POR
SEA

=== Depth chart ===
| Pos. | Starter | Bench |
|---|---|---|
| PG | Jordin Canada | Te-Hina Paopao |
| SG | Allisha Gray | Isobel Borlase |
| SF | Rhyne Howard | DeWanna Bonner |
| PF | Naz Hillmon | Sika Koné |
| C | Angel Reese | Madina Okot |

== Media coverage ==
The Finals were televised in the United States by USA Sports and NBC Sports as the first under the WNBA's new media rights deals; NBC broadcast games 1 and 4, while USA Network aired the remaining games, and all seven games were streamed by Peacock. To maximize viewership, USA Sports' games were simulcast by Versant sister networks E! and CNBC (with Syfy replacing CNBC for Game 6). Game 2 was also preceded by Live from the Orange Carpet, an E!-produced special hosted by comedian Lilly Singh and featuring appearances by Wanda Sykes and Tina Thompson among others.
