= 2024–25 WNBL season =

- League: Women's National Basketball League
- Sport: Basketball
- Duration: 30 October 2024 – 8 March 2025
- Teams: 8
- TV partner(s): ESPN; 9Go! 9Now

Regular season
- Top seed: Bendigo Spirit
- Season MVP: Sami Whitcomb (BEN)
- Top scorer: Sami Whitcomb (BEN)

Finals
- Champions: Bendigo Spirit
- Runners-up: Townsville Fire
- Finals MVP: Sami Whitcomb (BEN)

WNBL seasons
- ← 2023–24 2025–26 →

The 2024–25 WNBL season was the 45th season of the competition since its establishment in 1981. The Southside Flyers were the defending champions, but they failed to qualify for Finals this season. The Bendigo Spirit won their third championship title after defeating Townsville, 2–0 in the Grand Final series.

Cygnett remains as the WNBL's naming rights partner for the season, after signing a three-year deal in September 2022. In August 2024, the season structure was confirmed to again feature an 84-game regular season, with a best-of-three Semi-Final & Grand Final series' to follow. All games were confirmed to again be broadcast via 9Now and ESPN, for the third consecutive season. This season saw the WNBL's return to free-to-air television for the first time since 2019, with the addition of one game broadcast weekly on 9Go!.

== Ladder ==
#	2024–25 WNBL Championship ladder				
#	Team	W	L	PCT	GP
1	Bendigo Spirit	18	3	85.7	21
2	Perth Lynx	16	5	76.1	21
3	Townsville Fire	15	6	71.4	21
4	Sydney Flames	8	13	38.0	21
5	Canberra Capitals	8	13	38.0	21
6	Adelaide Lightning	7	14	33.3	21
7	Geelong United	6	15	28.5	21
8	Southside Flyers	6	15	28.5	21

== Regular season ==
=== Round 1 ===
30 October 2024	Geelong United	58–84	Townsville Fire	Geelong Arena, Geelong
7:00 PM (AEDT)	Scoring by quarter: 17–24, 17–24, 9–23, 15–13
ESPN	Pts: Froling 15; Rebs: Froling, Jones 7 Asts: Jones 4	Box Score	Pts: Froling 17; Rebs: Froling 9 Asts: Three players 4	Attendance: 1,006

2 November 2024	Bendigo Spirit	84–70	Adelaide Lightning	Red Energy Arena, Bendigo
7:30 PM (AEDT)	Scoring by quarter: 28–23, 20–22, 17–18, 19–7
9Now	Pts: Whitcomb 27; Rebs: Tolo 14; Asts: Burton, Wilson 7	Box Score	Pts: Dean 23; Rebs: Turner 17; Asts: Dean 4	Attendance: 619

2 November 2024	Perth Lynx	94–79	Southside Flyers	Bendat Basketball Centre, Perth
7:00 PM (AWST)	Scoring by quarter: 31–27, 26–18, 29–12, 8–22
9Now	Pts: Maley 22; Rebs: Maley 12; Asts: Wilson 8	Box Score	Pts: Kunek 22; Rebs: Kunek 11; Asts: Rocci 8	Attendance: 812

3 November 2024	Sydney Flames	102–85	Canberra Capitals	Qudos Bank Arena, Sydney
2:00 PM (AEDT)	Scoring by quarter: 35–21, 24–23, 22–18, 21–23
9Go!	Pts: Ruef 25; Rebs: George 11; Asts: Swain 9	Box Score	Pts: Munger 24; Rebs: Melbourne 6 Asts: Melbourne 4	Attendance: 3,457

=== Round 2 ===
6 November 2024	Perth Lynx	80–84	Townsville Fire	Bendat Basketball Centre, Perth
6:30 PM (AWST)	Scoring by quarter: 21–26, 25–25, 17–16, 17–17
ESPN	Pts: Sowah 21; Rebs: Amihere, Maley 5 Asts: Ciabattoni 6	Box Score	Pts: Froling, Woods 25; Rebs: Froling 10; Asts: Mansfield 7	Attendance: 582

7 November 2024	Geelong United	90–87	Southside Flyers	Geelong Arena, Geelong
7:00 PM (AEDT)	Scoring by quarter: 30–24, 24–27, 16–18, 20–18
9Now	Pts: Jones 19; Rebs: Froling 14; Asts: Four players 3	Box Score	Pts: Hillmon 27; Rebs: Hillmon 10; Asts: Cole 9	Attendance: 650

8 November 2024	Canberra Capitals	76–99	Bendigo Spirit	AIS Arena, Canberra
6:30 PM (AEDT)	Scoring by quarter: 22–28, 19–25, 14–25, 21–21
9Now	Pts: Melbourne 21; Rebs: Collier 11; Asts: Bobongie, Melbourne 3	Box Score	Pts: Whitcomb 25; Rebs: Tolo 8 Asts: Whitcomb 9	Attendance: 4,128

9 November 2024	Southside Flyers	83–75	Sydney Flames	State Basketball Centre, Melbourne
5:00 PM (AEDT)	Scoring by quarter: 21–26, 24–13, 22–19, 16–17
9Now	Pts: Cole 24; Rebs: Cole 10; Asts: Rocci 4	Box Score	Pts: George 22; Rebs: George 14; Asts: Ruef 6	Attendance: 1,627

9 November 2024	Adelaide Lightning	78–92	Perth Lynx	Adelaide Arena, Adelaide
7:30 PM (ACDT)	Scoring by quarter: 28–25, 18–28, 18–18, 14–21
9Now	Pts: Borlase 24; Rebs: Turner 11; Asts: Basham 5	Box Score	Pts: Maley 18; Rebs: Maley 12; Asts: Wilson 6

10 November 2024	Bendigo Spirit	95–78	Geelong United	Red Energy Arena, Bendigo
12:30 PM (AEDT)	Scoring by quarter: 31–14, 26–14, 22–23, 16–27
9Go!	Pts: Whitcomb 28; Rebs: Tolo, Whitcomb 7 Asts: Burton, Wilson 5	Box Score	Pts: Froling 26; Rebs: Froling 13; Asts: Jones, Shelley 4	Attendance: 542

=== Round 3 ===
13 November 2024	Sydney Flames	71–90	Bendigo Spirit	Quaycentre, Sydney
7:00 PM (AEDT)	Scoring by quarter: 18–29, 18–27, 17–19, 18–15
ESPN	Pts: Swain 25; Rebs: Morris 9 Asts: George 5	Box Score	Pts: Whitcomb 23; Rebs: Tolo 8 Asts: Whitcomb 5	Attendance: 985

14 November 2024	Canberra Capitals	90–92	Perth Lynx	AIS Arena, Canberra
6:30 PM (AEDT)	Scoring by quarter: 25–27, 26–20, 21–21, 18–24
9Now	Pts: Melbourne, Puoch 20; Rebs: Collier 12; Asts: Melbourne 8	Box Score	Pts: Amihere 24; Rebs: Amihere, Maley 10; Asts: Ciabattoni 5	Attendance: 1,412

16 November 2024	Geelong United	72–66(OT)	Adelaide Lightning	Geelong Arena, Geelong
6:00 PM (AEDT)	Scoring by quarter: 13–18, 19–17, 15–22, 17–7, Overtime: 8–2
9Now	Pts: Froling 19; Rebs: Froling, Jones 13; Asts: Three players 4	Box Score	Pts: Borlase 17; Rebs: Turner 13; Asts: Three players 3	Attendance: 1,075

16 November 2024	Townsville Fire	76–84	Bendigo Spirit	Townsville Entertainment Centre, Townsville
7:30 PM (AEST)	Scoring by quarter: 20–28, 22–15, 20–21, 14–20
9Now	Pts: Cooke 18; Rebs: Cox 13; Asts: Three players 3	Box Score	Pts: Whitcomb 30; Rebs: Wehrung, Whitcomb 6 Asts: Whitcomb 7	Attendance: 2,389

17 November 2024	Southside Flyers	98–77	Canberra Capitals	State Basketball Centre, Melbourne
12:30 PM (AEDT)	Scoring by quarter: 24–22, 23–17, 26–19, 25–19
9Go!	Pts: Hillmon 24; Rebs: Cole 11; Asts: Rocci 6	Box Score	Pts: Horvat 18; Rebs: Four players 7 Asts: Melbourne 9	Attendance: 1,755

=== Round 4 ===
20 November 2024	Adelaide Lightning	78–54	Sydney Flames	Adelaide Arena, Adelaide
6:30 PM (ACDT)	Scoring by quarter: 20–11, 18–12, 16–17, 24–14
ESPN	Pts: Dean 20; Rebs: Turner 10; Asts: Talbot 6	Box Score	Pts: Ruef 14; Rebs: Ruef 12; Asts: Three players 3	Attendance: 610

21 November 2024	Canberra Capitals	81–80	Townsville Fire	AIS Arena, Canberra
6:30 PM (AEDT)	Scoring by quarter: 12–20, 30–28, 23–15, 16–17
9Now	Pts: Melbourne 20; Rebs: Horvat 7 Asts: Melbourne 7	Box Score	Pts: Cooke 22; Rebs: Froling, Woods 9 Asts: Ellis 7	Attendance: 1,294

23 November 2024	Geelong United	60–73	Canberra Capitals	Geelong Arena, Geelong
5:00 PM (AEDT)	Scoring by quarter: 22–21, 15–16, 14–21, 9–15
9Now	Pts: Jones 16; Rebs: Froling 9 Asts: Shelley 8	Box Score	Pts: Melbourne 18; Rebs: Horvat 13; Asts: Melbourne 4	Attendance: 1,042

23 November 2024	Townsville Fire	53–47	Adelaide Lightning	Townsville Entertainment Centre, Townsville
7:00 PM (AEST)	Scoring by quarter: 9–18, 11–22, 16–2, 17–5
9Now	Pts: Woods 16; Rebs: Fowler 8 Asts: Cooke, Woods 3	Box Score	Pts: Basham, Dean 9 Rebs: Turner 12; Asts: Borlase 5	Attendance: 2,301

23 November 2024	Perth Lynx	84–78	Sydney Flames	Bendat Basketball Centre, Perth
7:30 PM (AWST)	Scoring by quarter: 19–29, 24–25, 21–10, 20–14
9Now	Pts: Amihere 28; Rebs: Maley 10; Asts: Amihere, Sowah 4	Box Score	Pts: Swain 26; Rebs: George, Ruef 16; Asts: Ruef 8	Attendance: 892

24 November 2024	Bendigo Spirit	79–71	Southside Flyers	Selkirk Stadium, Ballarat
12:30 PM (AEDT)	Scoring by quarter: 16–18, 11–24, 24–20, 28–9
9Go!	Pts: Burton 20; Rebs: Tolo 11; Asts: Burton 7	Box Score	Pts: Cole 18; Rebs: Hillmon 8 Asts: Cole 5	Attendance: 426

=== Round 5 ===
27 November 2024	Perth Lynx	106–80	Townsville Fire	Bendat Basketball Centre, Perth
6:30 PM (AWST)	Scoring by quarter: 21-17, 33-23, 31-17, 21-23
ESPN	Pts: Sowah 20; Rebs: Maley 9 Asts: Ciabattoni 6	Box Score	Pts: Froling 22; Rebs: Froling 9 Asts: Woods 7	Attendance: 1102

29 November 2024	Adelaide Lightning	68–69	Townsville Fire	Adelaide Arena, Adelaide
7:00 PM (ACDT)	Scoring by quarter: 19-22, 21-20, 21-8, 7-19
9Now	Pts: Borlase 18; Rebs: Turner 14; Asts: Talbot 6	Box Score	Pts: Woods 25; Rebs: Fowler 11; Asts: Woods 8	Attendance: 410

30 November 2024	Sydney Flames	90–55	Geelong United	Quaycentre, Sydney
5:00 PM (AEDT)	Scoring by quarter: 23-12, 20-17, 22-5, 22-21
9Now	Pts: Swain 25; Rebs: Morris 10; Asts: Swain, Taylor 5	Box Score	Pts: Froling 11; Rebs: Froling 12; Asts: Elsworthy 4	Attendance: 1285

30 November 2024	Bendigo Spirit	98–78	Canberra Capitals	Red Energy Arena, Bendigo
7:30 PM (AEDT)	Scoring by quarter: 35-22, 25-18, 17-12, 21-26
9Now	Pts: Burton 22; Rebs: Whitcomb 9 Asts: Burton 6	Box Score	Pts: Puoch 16; Rebs: Melbourne 10; Asts: Melbourne 8	Attendance: 721

1 December 2024	Southside Flyers	82–89	Perth Lynx	State Basketball Centre, Melbourne
12:30 PM (AEDT)	Scoring by quarter: 19-21, 21-30, 26-19, 16-19
9Go!	Pts: Cole 22; Rebs: Hillmon 13; Asts: Hillmon 5	Box Score	Pts: Sowah 23; Rebs: Maley 15; Asts: Ciabattoni 5	Attendance: 1453

=== Round 6 ===
4 December 2024	Canberra Capitals	78–89	Southside Flyers	AIS Arena, Canberra
7:00 PM (AEDT)	Scoring by quarter: 22-20, 19-21, 15-20, 22-28
ESPN	Pts: Melbourne 16; Rebs: Puoch 9 Asts: Melbourne 7	Box Score	Pts: Rocci 22; Rebs: Hillmon 13; Asts: Cole, Rocci 4	Attendance: 1431

5 December 2024	Perth Lynx	66–72	Bendigo Spirit	Bendat Basketball Centre, Perth
7:30 PM (AWST)	Scoring by quarter: 14-17, 21-15, 18-15, 13-25
9Now	Pts: Sowa 25; Rebs: Maley 15; Asts: Sowa 5	Box Score	Pts: Griffin 17; Rebs: Whitcomb 13; Asts: Whitcomb 10	Attendance: 602

6 December 2024	Southside Flyers	71–97	Adelaide Lightning	State Basketball Centre, Melbourne
7:00 PM (AEDT)	Scoring by quarter: 17-28, 17-18, 11-23, 26-28
9Now	Pts: Loughridge 23; Rebs: Hillmon 15; Asts: Loughridge 3	Box Score	Pts: Bourne 21; Rebs: Turner 10; Asts: Borlase 4	Attendance: 953

7 December 2024	Sydney Flames	86–75	Perth Lynx	Quaycentre, Sydney
7:30 PM (AEDT)	Scoring by quarter: 23-20, 23-21, 18-17, 22-17
9Now	Pts: George 28; Rebs: George 14; Asts: Swain 5	Box Score	Pts: Sowah 13; Rebs: Maley 10; Asts: Clinch Hoycard, Wilson 3	Attendance: 717

8 December 2024	Geelong United	69–59	Adelaide Lightning	Geelong Arena, Geelong
12:30 PM (AEDT)	Scoring by quarter: 14-19, 18-7, 16-13, 21-20
9Go!	Pts: Jones 13; Rebs: Froling 8 Asts: Conti 4	Box Score	Pts: Borlase, Bourne 14; Rebs: Turner 10; Asts: Talbot 7	Attendance: 780

=== Round 7 ===
11 December 2024	Southside Flyers	86–88(OT)	Geelong United	State Basketball Centre, Melbourne
7:00 PM (AEDT)	Scoring by quarter: 28-15, 11-20, 24-27, 15-16, Overtime: 8-10
ESPN	Pts: Kunek 25; Rebs: Hillmon 11; Asts: Rocci 9	Box Score	Pts: Jones 27; Rebs: Three players 8 Asts: Jones 8	Attendance: 1584

12 December 2024	Perth Lynx	87–63	Canberra Capitals	Bendat Basketball Centre, Perth
7:00 PM (AWST)	Scoring by quarter: 20-10, 37-20, 20-14, 10-19
9Now	Pts: Sowah 24; Rebs: Amihere 16; Asts: Wilson 4	Box Score	Pts: Puoch 18; Rebs: Tofaeono 10; Asts: Melbourne 6	Attendance: 792

14 December 2024	Bendigo Spirit	86–80	Townsville Fire	Red Energy Arena, Bendigo
5:00 PM (AEDT)	Scoring by quarter: 28-16, 24-16, 13-29, 21-19
9Now	Pts: Whitcomb 35; Rebs: Tolo, Griffin 9 Asts: Burton, Whitcomb 6	Box Score	Pts:' Three players 16; Rebs: Woods 12; Asts: Woods 5	Attendance: 819

14 December 2024	Geelong United	74–81	Sydney Flames	Geelong Arena, Geelong
7:30 PM (AWST)	Scoring by quarter: 12-25, 20-22, 23-21, 19-13
9Now	Pts:' Jones 16; Rebs: Froling 10; Asts: Three players 3	Box Score	Pts: Swain 21; Rebs: George 13; Asts: Swain 7	Attendance: 1014

15 December 2024	Adelaide Lightning	68–67	Canberra Capitals	Adelaide Arena, Adelaide
12:00 PM (ACDT)	Scoring by quarter: 17-15, 22-13, 19-19, 10-20
9Go!	Pts: Borlase 22; Rebs: Turner 9 Asts: Dean, Talbot 4	Box Score	Pts: Collier 27; Rebs: Collier 22; Asts: Melbourne 8	Attendance: 502

=== Round 8 ===
18 December 2024	Townsville Fire	98–73	Sydney Flames	Townsville Entertainment Centre, Townsville
7:00 PM (AEST)	Scoring by quarter: 33-13, 30-15, 23-28, 12-17
ESPN	Pts: Ellis, Shiels 18; Rebs: Cox 10; Asts: Woods 6	Box Score	Pts: Swain, Taylor 15; Rebs: Pitman 6 Asts: Calleia, Swain 3	Attendance: N/A

19 December 2024	Bendigo Spirit	68–71	Perth Lynx	Red Energy Arena, Bendigo
6:30 PM (AEDT)	Scoring by quarter: 16-22, 22-12, 14-17, 16-20
9Now	Pts: Tolo 16; Rebs: Griffin 17; Asts: Griffin 5	Box Score	Pts: Wilson 20; Rebs: Maley 16; Asts: Maley 4	Attendance: 833

20 December 2024	Adelaide Lightning	82–72	Southside Flyers	Adelaide Arena, Adelaide
7:30 PM (ACDT)	Scoring by quarter: 24-19, 23-23, 21-20, 14-10
9Now	Pts: Bourne, Turner 18; Rebs: Turner 12; Asts: Talbot 7	Box Score	Pts: Kunek 27; Rebs: Hillmon 16; Asts: Kunek 4	Attendance: 922

21 December 2024	Townsville Fire	81–48	Canberra Capitals	Townsville Entertainment Centre, Townsville
7:00 PM (AEST)	Scoring by quarter: 18-10, 17-17, 23-4, 23-17
9Now	Pts: Froling, Woods 17; Rebs: Cox 10; Asts: Shiels 7	Box Score	Pts: Melbourne 16; Rebs: Collier 10; Asts: Melbourne 5	Attendance: 3206

22 December 2024	Sydney Flames	73–86	Adelaide Lightning	Quaycentre, Sydney
12:30 PM (AEDT)	Scoring by quarter: 25-18, 18-13, 19-21, 11-34
9Go!	Pts: Tupaea 18; Rebs: George 7 Asts: Taylor 4	Box Score	Pts: Borlase 22; Rebs: Turner 14; Asts: Talbot 6	Attendance: 1479

22 December 2024	Southside Flyers	91–88	Bendigo Spirit	State Basketball Centre, Melbourne
3:00 PM (AEDT)	Scoring by quarter: 25-20, 20-26, 25-11, 21-31
9Now	Pts: Cole 22; Rebs: Hillmon 10; Asts: Cole 4	Box Score	Pts: Burton 31; Rebs: Griffin 10; Asts: Whitcomb 8	Attendance: 1582

23 December 2024	Perth Lynx	96–71	Geelong United	HBF Stadium, Perth
7:30 PM (AWST)	Scoring by quarter: 23-19, 22-17, 21-17, 30-18
9Now	Pts: Atwell 19; Rebs: Maley 14; Asts: Wilson 7	Box Score	Pts: Froling 17; Rebs: Jones 7 Asts: Shelley 5	Attendance: 1124

=== Round 9 ===
27 December 2024	Adelaide Lightning	67–95	Bendigo Spirit	Adelaide Arena, Adelaide
7:00 PM (ACDT)	Scoring by quarter: 13-24, 20-28, 14-25, 20-18
ESPN	Pts: Borlase 18; Rebs: Talbot 10; Asts: Andrews, Bourne 5	Box Score	Pts: Griffin 23; Rebs: Griffin 14; Asts: Whitcomb 9	Attendance: N/A

29 December 2024	Canberra Capitals	80–89	Perth Lynx	AIS Arena, Canberra
12:30 PM (AEDT)	Scoring by quarter: 23-18, 23-21, 18-27, 16-23
9Go!	Pts: Collier 20; Rebs: Collier 10; Asts: Melbourne 11	Box Score	Pts: Amihere 29; Rebs: Maley 10; Asts: Wilson 9	Attendance: 1604

29 December 2024	Townsville Fire	85–61	Geelong United	Townsville Entertainment Centre, Townsville
2:30 PM (AEST)	Scoring by quarter: 24-14, 19-19, 21-14, 21-14
9Now	Pts: Woods 23; Rebs: A. Froling 9 Asts: Woods 6	Box Score	Pts: Jones 22; Rebs: K. Froling 11; Asts: K. Froling 4	Attendance: 2307

30 December 2024	Sydney Flames	99–91	Southside Flyers	Qudos Bank Arena, Sydney
5:00 PM (AEDT)	'Scoring by quarter: 29-31, 24-15, 20-19, 26-26
9Now	Pts: George 33; Rebs: George 9 Asts: Swain 11	Box Score	Pts: Cole 23; Rebs: Cole 7 Asts: Cole 6	Attendance: 3103

31 December 2024	Townsville Fire	65–76	Bendigo Spirit	Townsville Entertainment Centre, Townsville
7:00 PM (AEST)	Scoring by quarter: 20-15, 14-22, 18-26, 13-13
9Now	Pts: Ellis 18; Rebs: Cox 12; Asts: Woods 8	Box Score	Pts: Burton 18; Rebs: Griffin 9 Asts: Burton 7	Attendance: 2730

=== Round 10 ===
2 January 2025	Sydney Flames	71–92	Bendigo Spirit	Qudos Bank Arena, Sydney
5:00 PM (AEDT)	Scoring by quarter: 24-31, 17-25, 12-26, 18-10
ESPN	Pts: Taylor 20; Rebs: George 8 Asts: Taylor, Tupaea 4	Box Score	Pts: Burton 20; Rebs: Griffin 13; Asts: Whitcomb 6	Attendance: 2734

3 January 2025	Adelaide Lightning	77–88	Canberra Capitals	Adelaide Arena, Adelaide
7:00 PM (ACDT)	Scoring by quarter: 22-16, 21-28, 23-21, 11-23
9Now	Pts: Bourne 29; Rebs: Turner 19; Asts: Talbot 8	Box Score	Pts: Collier 25; Rebs: Collier 16; Asts: Melbourne 8	Attendance: 977

4 January 2025	Southside Flyers	75–78	Townsville Fire	State Basketball Centre, Melbourne
5:00 PM (AEDT)	Scoring by quarter: 20-22, 17-25, 20-15, 18-16
9Now	Pts: Hillmon 26; Rebs: Hillmon 12; Asts: Rocci 9	Box Score	Pts: Froling 17; Rebs: Cox 9 Asts: Woods 10	Attendance: 1858

5 January 2025	Canberra Capitals	89–69	Geelong United	AIS Arena, Canberra
12:30 PM (AEDT)	Scoring by quarter: 27-15, 18-20, 23-9, 21-25
9Go!	Pts: Puoch 20; Rebs: Horvat 12; Asts: Horvat, Melbourne 5	Box Score	Pts: Froling 17; Rebs: Froling 11; Asts: Jones 7	Attendance: 1602

5 January 2025	Perth Lynx	94–76	Adelaide Lightning	HBF Stadium, Perth
6:30 PM (AWST)	Scoring by quarter: 21-14, 21-21, 28-16, 24-25
9Now	Pts: Amihere 20; Rebs: Maley 14; Asts: Wilson 10	Box Score	Pts: Talbot 17; Rebs: Turner 14; Asts: Talbot 6	Attendance: 1396

=== Round 11 ===
8 January 2025	Southside Flyers	70–76	Geelong United	State Basketball Centre, Melbourne
7:00 PM (AEDT)	Scoring by quarter: 18-9, 18-21, 15-21, 19-25
ESPN	Pts: Loughridge 22; Rebs: Reed 12; Asts: Reed 6	Box Score	Pts: Shelley 20; Rebs: Sharp 10; Asts: Shelley 7	Attendance: 2374

11 January 2025	Canberra Capitals	91–76	Adelaide Lightning	AIS Arena, Canberra
3:30 PM (AEDT)	Scoring by quarter: 28-14, 15-21, 23-18, 25-23
9Now	Pts: Puoch 27; Rebs: Collier 10; Asts: Melbourne 12	Box Score	Pts: Dean 17; Rebs: Turner 16; Asts: Dean, Turner 5	Attendance: 2050

11 January 2025	Townsville Fire	73–63	Southside Flyers	Townsville Entertainment Centre, Townsville
7:00 PM (AEST)	Scoring by quarter: 11-12, 11-17, 27-13, 24-21
9Now	Pts: Cox 25; Rebs: Froling 8 Asts: Woods 5	Box Score	Pts: Hillmon 27; Rebs: Hillmon 11; Asts: Reed, Rocci 4	Attendance: 2397

12 January 2025	Geelong United	77–80	Perth Lynx	Geelong Arena, Geelong
12:30 PM (AEDT)	Scoring by quarter: 18-23, 19-15, 16-22, 24-20
9Go!	Pts: Sharp, Shelley 16; Rebs: Sharp 10; Asts: Sharp 4	Box Score	Pts: Atwell 22; Rebs: Amihere 13; Asts: Maley 4	Attendance: 1148

12 January 2025	Bendigo Spirit	80–62	Sydney Flames	Mildura Sporting Precinct, Mildura
3:00 PM (AEDT)	Scoring by quarter: 28-21, 17-13, 24-14, 11-14
9Now	Pts: Burton, Whitcomb 18; Rebs: Griffin 9 Asts: Burton 6	Box Score	Pts: Swain 14; Rebs: George 11; Asts: George 6	Attendance: 712

=== Round 12 ===
15 January 2025	Bendigo Spirit	95–86	Perth Lynx	Red Energy Arena, Bendigo
7:00 PM (AEDT)	Scoring by quarter: 23-30, 22-23, 20-17, 30-16
ESPN	Pts: Whitcomb 29; Rebs: Griffin 15; Asts: Burton 9	Box Score	Pts: Wilson 29; Rebs: Maley 14; Asts: Atwell, Maley 4	Attendance: 1094

17 January 2025	Geelong United	90–70	Sydney Flames	Geelong Arena, Geelong
7:00 PM (AEDT)	Scoring by quarter: 22-27, 24-19, 32-16, 12-8
9Now	Pts: Shelley 24; Rebs: Jones 12; Asts: Shelley 6	Box Score	Pts: George 27; Rebs: George 17; Asts: Tupaea 6	Attendance: 1011

18 January 2025	Townsville Fire	105–71	Canberra Capitals	Townsville Entertainment Centre, Townsville
7:00 PM (AEST)	Scoring by quarter: 30-27, 23-13, 31-18, 21-13
9Now	Pts: Woods 24; Rebs: Cox 11; Asts: Woods 11	Box Score	Pts: Munger 17; Rebs: Collier 10; Asts: Melbourne 7	Attendance: 2350

18 January 2025	Perth Lynx	86–78	Southside Flyers	HBF Stadium, Perth
7:30 PM (AWST)	Scoring by quarter: 18-21, 23-33, 18-12, 27-12
9Now	Pts: Wilson 27; Rebs: Maley 22; Asts: Maley 5	Box Score	Pts: Hillmon 23; Rebs: Hillmon, Kunek 9 Asts: Reed 6	Attendance: 1181

19 January 2025	Sydney Flames	84–60	Adelaide Lightning	Qudos Bank Arena, Sydney
12:00 PM (AEDT)	Scoring by quarter: 30-9, 15-18, 23-19, 16-14
9Go!	Pts: Swain 23; Rebs: Morris 14; Asts: Swain 6	Box Score	Pts: Talbot, Turner 14; Rebs: Turner 12; Asts: Turner 4	Attendance: 4205

19 January 2025	Bendigo Spirit	95–73	Geelong United	Geelong Arena, Geelong
4:00 PM (AEDT)	Scoring by quarter: 25-22, 16-15, 25-13, 29-23
9Now	Pts: Griffin 29; Rebs: Griffin, Tolo 7 Asts: Wilson 10	Box Score	Pts: Shelley 19; Rebs: Sharp 9 Asts: Shelley 7	Attendance: 875

=== Round 13 ===
23 January 2025	Townsville Fire	89–75	Sydney Flames	Townsville Entertainment Centre, Townsville
7:00 PM (AEST)	Scoring by quarter: 25-14, 33-20, 13-15, 18-26
ESPN	Pts: Woods 21; Rebs: Cox 8 Asts: Woods 7	Box Score	Pts: Swain 40; Rebs: George 9 Asts: Tupaea 4	Attendance: 2193

24 January 2025	Bendigo Spirit	65–59	Adelaide Lightning	Red Energy Arena, Bendigo
6:30 PM (AEDT)	Scoring by quarter: 20-11, 14-20, 18-17, 13-11
9Now	Pts: Griffin 19; Rebs: Griffin 14; Asts: Whitcomb 4	Box Score	Pts: Borlase 16; Rebs: Turner 14; Asts: Talbot 4	Attendance: 1847

25 January 2025	Canberra Capitals	88–73	Southside Flyers	AIS Arena, Canberra
3:00 PM (AEDT)	Scoring by quarter: 24-20, 24-20, 21-19, 19-14
9Now	Pts: Collier 19; Rebs: Puoch 10; Asts: Melbourne 10	Box Score	Pts: Loughridge 17; Rebs: Kunek 11; Asts: Kunek 4	Attendance: 1579

25 January 2025	Sydney Flames	83–105	Perth Lynx	Quaycentre, Sydney
5:30 PM (AEDT)	Scoring by quarter: 24-28, 23-24, 10-39, 26-14
9Now	Pts: Taylor 18; Rebs: George, Pitman 7 Asts: Taylor 5	Box Score	Pts: Sowah 23; Rebs: Amihere, Maley 8 Asts: Wilson 5	Attendance: 1563

25 January 2025	Townsville Fire	89–70	Geelong United	Townsville Entertainment Centre, Townsville
7:00 PM (AEST)	Scoring by quarter: 23-20, 23-19, 21-20, 22-11
9Now	Pts: Cox 26; Rebs: Froling 11; Asts: Woods 12	Box Score	Pts: Shelley 19; Rebs: Sharp 13; Asts: Brett 5	Attendance: 2409

=== Round 14 ===
29 January 2025	Geelong United	60–81	Bendigo Spirit	Geelong Arena, Geelong
7:00 PM (AEDT)	Scoring by quarter: 18-17, 22-30, 15-17, 5-17
ESPN	Pts: Jones 23; Rebs: Jones 10; Asts: Jones 5	Box Score	Pts: Whitcomb 20; Rebs: Griffin 7 Asts: Whitcomb 8	Attendance: 810

30 January 2025	Canberra Capitals	88–92(OT)	Sydney Flames	AIS Arena, Canberra
6:30 PM (AEDT)	Scoring by quarter: 30-28, 15-16, 19-19, 16-17, Overtime: 8-12
9Now	Pts: Melbourne 28; Rebs: Puoch 11; Asts: Bobongie, Melbourne 4	Box Score	Pts: Swain 36; Rebs: George 17; Asts: Swain 6	Attendance: 1705

31 January 2025	Southside Flyers	85–90	Townsville Fire	State Basketball Centre, Melbourne
7:00 PM (AEDT)	Scoring by quarter: 21–32, 21–16, 21–26, 22–16
9Now	Pts: Hillmon 21; Rebs: Hillmon 7 Asts: Rocci 5	Boxscore	Pts: Froling 18; Rebs: Cox 8 Asts: Cox, Woods 6	Attendance: 887

1 February 2025	Geelong United	77–91	Canberra Capitals	Geelong Arena, Geelong
7:30 PM (AEDT)	Scoring by quarter: 25–28, 16–18, 13–24, 21–21
9Now	Pts: Sharp 23; Rebs: Hank 12; Asts: Brett 5	Boxscore	Pts: Collier 23; Rebs: Munger, Puoch 7 Asts: Melbourne 6	Attendance: 1068

1 February 2025	Adelaide Lightning	87–69	Perth Lynx	Adelaide Arena, Adelaide
7:30 PM (ACDT)	Scoring by quarter: 28–15, 18–24, 16–19, 25–11
9Now	Pts: Bourne, Talbot 21; Rebs: Turner 15; Asts: Turner 8	Boxscore	Pts: Atwell 18; Rebs: Maley 14; Asts: Wilson 7	Attendance: 650

2 February 2025	Bendigo Spirit	92–73	Southside Flyers	Red Energy Arena, Bendigo
12:30 PM (AEDT)	Scoring by quarter: 30–22, 21–13, 25–13, 16–25
9Go!	Pts: Whitcomb 33; Rebs: Tolo 9 Asts: Burton 7	Boxscore	Pts: Hillmon 22; Rebs: Ernst 6 Asts: Rocci 5	Attendance: 837

=== Round 15 ===
5 February 2025	Adelaide Lightning	63–90	Townsville Fire	Adelaide Arena, Adelaide
7:00 PM (ACDT)	Scoring by quarter: 13–29, 18–20, 13–14, 19–27
	Pts: Borlase 16; Rebs: Turner 16; Asts: Talbot 5	Boxscore	Pts: Froling 22; Rebs: Cox 11; Asts: Mansfield, Woods 5	Attendance: 650

7 February 2025	Perth Lynx	95–77	Geelong United	Bendat Basketball Centre, Perth
7:00 PM (AWST)	Scoring by quarter: 24–18, 28–12, 25–20, 18–27
	Pts: Sowah 22; Rebs: Maley 14; Asts: Wilson 7	Boxscore	Pts: Shelley 25; Rebs: Jones, Sharp 6 Asts: Jones, Shelley 6	Attendance: 814

9 February 2025	Southside Flyers	84–78	Adelaide Lightning	State Basketball Centre, Melbourne
12:30 PM (AEDT)	Scoring by quarter: 22-18, 27–27, 21-18, 14–15
9Now	Pts: Ernst 16; Rebs: Hillmon 9 Asts: Rocci 6	Boxscore	Pts: Turner 18; Rebs: Turner 19; Asts: Dean 4	Attendance: 2,041

9 February 2025	Canberra Capitals	71–86	Sydney Flames	AIS Arena, Canberra
3:00 PM (AEDT)	Scoring by quarter: 17-16, 19-22, 14-16, 21-32
9Now	Pts: Puoch 21; Rebs: Collier 8 Asts: Three players 3	Boxscore	Pts: Brancatisano 26; Rebs: Taylor 8 Asts: Swain 7	Attendance: 1,999

=== Round 16 ===
12 February 2025	Sydney Flames	50–83	Townsville Fire	Quaycentre, Sydney
7:00 PM (AEDT)	Scoring by quarter: 15–27, 11–21, 12–23, 12–12
ESPN	Pts: Taylor 14; Rebs: Pitman 6 Asts: Swain, Taylor 2	Boxscore	Pts: Ellis 16; Rebs: Three players 8 Asts: Fowler 4	Attendance: 297

14 February 2025	Perth Lynx	95–77	Geelong United	Bendat Basketball Centre, Perth
7:00 PM (AWST)	Scoring by quarter: 24–18, 28–12, 25–20, 18–27
9Now	Pts: Sowah 22; Rebs: Maley 14; Asts: Wilson 7	Boxscore	Pts: Shelley 25; Rebs: Jones, Sharp 6 Asts: Jones, Shelley 6	Attendance: 814

15 February 2025	Canberra Capitals	83–74	Bendigo Spirit	AIS Arena, Canberra
3:30 PM (AEDT)	Scoring by quarter: 17–17, 22–21, 21–21, 23–15
9Now	Pts: Melbourne 40; Rebs: Collier, Melbourne 10; Asts: Melbourne 7	Boxscore	Pts: Burton 29; Rebs: Griffin 10; Asts: Burton 7	Attendance: 2,064

15 February 2025	Sydney Flames	67–83	Southside Flyers	Quaycentre, Sydney
5:30 PM (AEDT)	Scoring by quarter: 23–18, 15–22, 19–24, 10–19
9Now	Pts: Swain 20; Rebs: Morris 11; Asts: Swain 5	Boxscore	Pts: Hillmon 30; Rebs: Hillmon 9 Asts: Rocci 9	Attendance: 1,655

16 February 2025	Adelaide Lightning	87–70	Geelong United	Adelaide Arena, Adelaide
12:00 PM (ACDT)	Scoring by quarter: 27-27, 15–19, 27–14, 18–10
9Now	Pts: Turner 19; Rebs: Borlase, Turner 9 Asts: Talbot 6	Boxscore	Pts: Brett 18; Rebs: Brett 9 Asts: Sharp 4	Attendance: 650

16 February 2025	Townsville Fire	86–87(OT)	Perth Lynx	Townsville Entertainment Centre, Townsville
2:00 PM (AEST)	Scoring by quarter: 26-15, 16–22, 16–18, 17–20, Overtime: 11–12
9Go!	Pts: Woods 27; Rebs: Cox, Froling 10; Asts: Mansfield, Woods 4	Boxscore	Pts: Wilson 21; Rebs: Maley 14; Asts: Wilson 5	Attendance: 3,489

== Finals ==
Semi Finals
1	Bendigo Spirit	2
4	Sydney Flames	0
3	Townsville Fire	2
2	Perth Lynx	0

Grand Final
1	Bendigo Spirit	2
3	Townsville Fire	0

== Statistics ==
=== Individual statistic leaders ===
Category	Player	Statistic
Points per game	Sami Whitcomb (BEN)	21.0 PPG
Rebounds per game	Brianna Turner (ADL)	12.7 RPG
Assists per game	Jade Melbourne (CBR)	6.8 APG
Steals per game	Jaz Shelley (GEE)	2.5 SPG
Blocks per game	Lauren Cox (TSV); Brianna Turner (ADL)	3.1 BPG

=== Individual game highs ===
Category	Player	Statistic
Points	Shaneice Swain (SYD); Jade Melbourne (CBR)	40
Rebounds	Anneli Maley (PER)	22
Assists	Courtney Woods (TSV); Jade Melbourne (CBR)	12
Steals	Jaz Shelley (GEE)	7
Blocks	Brianna Turner (ADL); Laeticia Amihere (PER)	6

== Awards ==
=== Postseason Awards ===
Award	Winner	Position	Team
Most Valuable Player	Sami Whitcomb	Guard	Bendigo Spirit
Grand Final MVP	Sami Whitcomb	Guard	Bendigo Spirit
Defensive Player of the Year	Lauren Cox	Forward	Townsville Fire
Sixth Woman of the Year	Abigail Wehrung	Guard	Bendigo Spirit
Breakout Player of the Year	Abbey Ellis	Guard	Townsville Fire
Coach of the Year	Shannon Seebohm	Coach	Townsville Fire
Leading Scorer Award	Sami Whitcomb	Guard	Bendigo Spirit
Leading Rebounder Award	Brianna Turner	Forward	Adelaide Lightning
Golden Hands Award	Veronica Burton	Guard	Bendigo Spirit
Cygnett Community Award	Courtney Woods	Guard	Townsville Fire
All-WNBL First Team	Alex Wilson	Guard	Perth Lynx
All-WNBL First Team	Sami Whitcomb	Guard	Bendigo Spirit
All-WNBL First Team	Courtney Woods	Guard	Townsville Fire
All-WNBL First Team	Naz Hillmon	Forward	Southside Flyers
All-WNBL First Team	Laeticia Amihere	Forward	Perth Lynx
All-WNBL Second Team	Jade Melbourne	Guard	Canberra Capitals
All-WNBL Second Team	Veronica Burton	Guard	Bendigo Spirit
All-WNBL Second Team	Miela Sowah	Guard	Perth Lynx
All-WNBL Second Team	Anneli Maley	Forward	Perth Lynx
All-WNBL Second Team	Kelsey Griffin	Forward	Bendigo Spirit

== Team captains and coaches ==
Team	Captain	Coach
Adelaide Lightning	Stephanie Talbot	Natalie Hurst
Bendigo Spirit	Kelsey Griffin	Kennedy Kereama
Canberra Capitals	Jade Melbourne	Paul Goriss
Geelong United	Keely Froling	Chris Lucas
Perth Lynx	Amy Atwell / Anneli Maley (co)	Ryan Petrik
Southside Flyers	Rebecca Cole	Kristi Harrower
Sydney Flames	Cayla George	Guy Molloy
Townsville Fire	Alicia Froling, Lauren Mansfield, Courtney Woods (group)	Shannon Seebohm
