= Laeticia Amihere =

Canadian basketball player (born 2001)

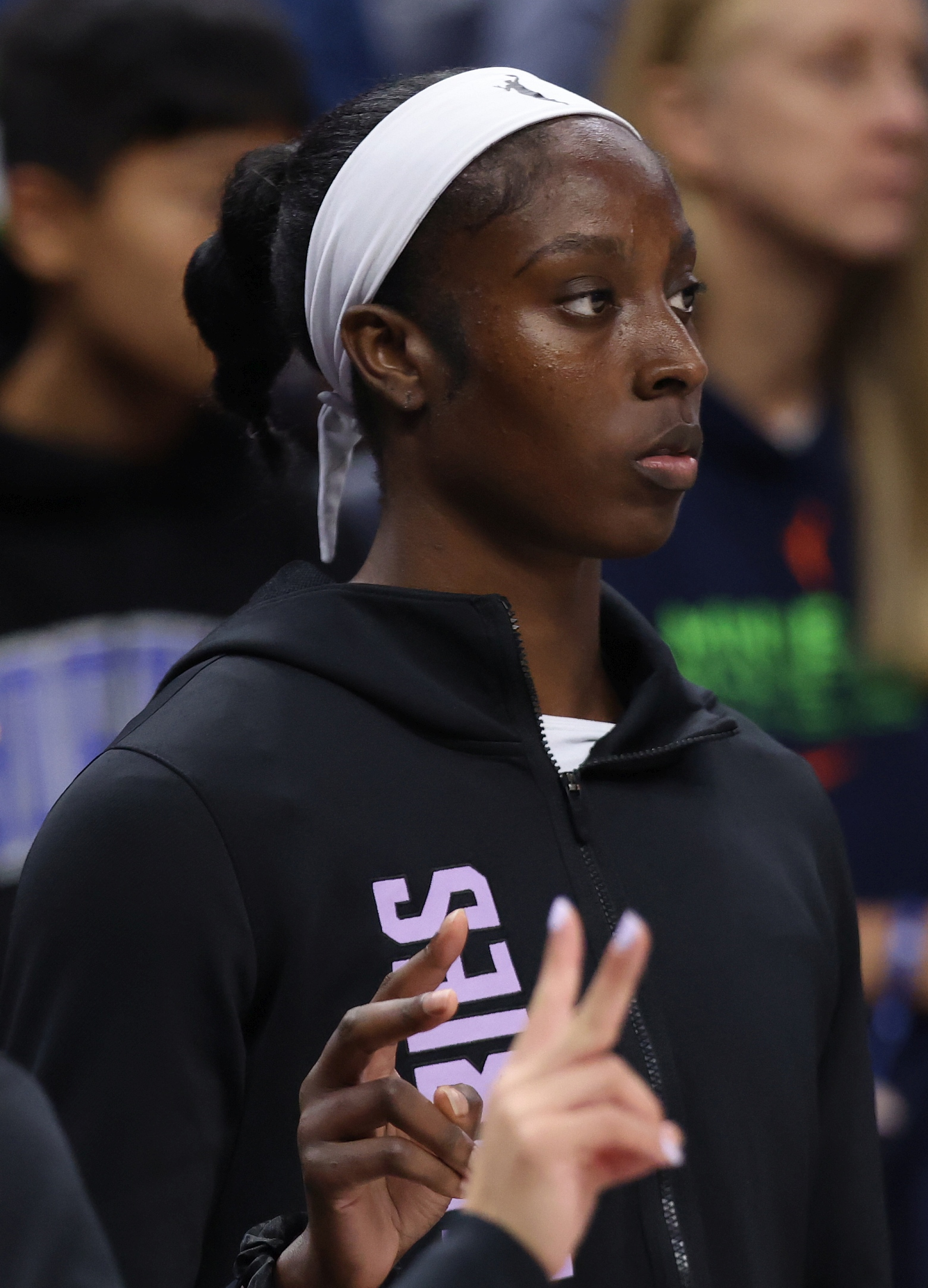
- Amihere with the Golden State Valkyries in 2025

No. 3 – Golden State Valkyries
- Position: Forward
- League: WNBA

Personal information
- Born: July 10, 2001 (age 25) Mississauga, Ontario, Canada
- Listed height: 6 ft 3 in (1.91 m)
- Listed weight: 185 lb (84 kg)

Career information
- High school: King's Christian Collegiate (Oakville, Ontario)
- College: South Carolina (2019–2023)
- WNBA draft: 2023: 1st round, 8th overall pick
- Drafted by: Atlanta Dream
- Playing career: 2023–present

Career history
- 2023–2024: Atlanta Dream
- 2024–2025: Perth Lynx
- 2025–present: Golden State Valkyries
- 2025: Uni Girona CB

Career highlights
- WNBA champion (2026); All-WNBL First Team (2025); NCAA champion (2022)
- Stats at Basketball Reference
Medals
Women's basketball
Representing Canada
FIBA Under-19 World Cup
Bronze medal – third place	2017 Italy	Team
FIBA Americas Under-16 Championship
Gold medal – first place	2015 Mexico	Team

Laeticia Amihere (born July 10, 2001) is a Canadian professional basketball player for the Golden State Valkyries of the Women's National Basketball Association (WNBA). She played college basketball for the South Carolina Gamecocks. She was drafted eighth overall by the Atlanta Dream in the 2023 WNBA draft.

== Early life ==
Amihere was born in Mississauga, Ontario, to a Ghanaian father and a mother from Ivory Coast. She attended King's Christian Collegiate in Oakville, Ontario. She became the first Canadian female to dunk in a game when she was 15 years old.

== College career ==
Amihere made her debut with the South Carolina Gamecocks women's basketball team in the 2019–20 NCAA season.

On March 30, 2021, Amihere had 10 points, eight rebounds and nine blocks against Texas in the NCAA Elite 8. She set a program record for blocks in an NCAA Tournament game.

Amihere scored a career-high 18 points against Oregon Ducks women's basketball on November 11, 2021. She helped South Carolina win the 2021–22 NCAA championship.

Amihere's final college season came in 2022–23.

== Professional career ==
=== WNBA ===
==== Atlanta Dream ====
Amihere was drafted by the Atlanta Dream with the eighth pick of the first round of the 2023 WNBA draft. She made her WNBA debut on May 30, 2023, against the Chicago Sky. She averaged 2.7 points and 1.0 rebounds in 7.0 minutes across 21 games in the 2023 season.

In the 2024 season, Amihere averaged 1.2 points and 1.7 rebounds in 5.2 minutes across 16 games for the Dream.

On February 1, 2025, Amihere was waived by the Dream.

==== Golden State Valkyries ====
On February 6, 2025, Amihere was acquired by the Golden State Valkyries on a waiver claim. On May 14, she was waived by the Valkyries. Eventually, on June 8, Amihere was signed back by the Valkyries after a roster spot opening.

=== Overseas ===
==== Perth Lynx ====
On September 18, 2024, Amihere signed with the Perth Lynx of the Women's National Basketball League (WNBL) for the 2024–25 season.

==== Girona ====
Amihere signed a short-term contract with Uni Girona CB of the Liga Femenina de Baloncesto for the 2025–26 season.

== National team career ==
=== Junior national team career ===
Amihere has won gold at the 2015 FIBA Americas Under-16 Championship for Women as part of the junior team, and then bronze at the 2017 FIBA Under-19 Women's Basketball World Cup.

=== Senior national team career ===
In June 2021, Amihere was rostered for Team Canada for 2021 FIBA Women's AmeriCup

In July 2021, Amihere was named to Canada's 2020 Olympic team.

In September 2022, Amihere was rostered for Team Canada in the 2022 FIBA Women's Basketball World Cup

Amihere competed for Canada at the 2024 Summer Olympics.

== Career statistics ==
Legend
GP	Games played	GS	Games started	MPG	Minutes per game	RPG	Rebounds per game
APG	Assists per game	SPG	Steals per game	BPG	Blocks per game	PPG	Points per game
TO	Turnovers per game	FG%	Field-goal percentage	3P%	3-point field-goal percentage	FT%	Free-throw percentage
**Bold**	Career best	°	League leader

†	Denotes season(s) in which Amihere won a WNBA championship
*	Denotes season(s) in which Amihere won an NCAA Championship

=== WNBA ===
==== Regular season ====
WNBA regular season statistics
Year	Team	GP	GS	MPG	FG%	3P%	FT%	RPG	APG	SPG	BPG	TO	PPG
2023	Atlanta	21	0	7.0	.405	.000	.537	1.0	.2	.2	.4	**.5**	2.7
2024	Atlanta	16	0	5.2	.269	—	.294	1.7	.2	.1	.2	**.5**	1.2
2025	Golden State	29	0	**13.2**	.456	.143	**.778**	**4.3**	.9	**.6**	.4	1.1	**5.4**
2026^{†}	Golden State	**39**	**1**	11.7	**.491**	**.412**	.579	3.0	**1.0**	.5	**.8**	.8	3.9
**Career**	4 years, 2 teams	105	1	10.2	.446	.256	.612	2.8	.7	.4	.5	.8	3.6

==== Playoffs ====
WNBA playoff statistics
Year	Team	GP	GS	MPG	FG%	3P%	FT%	RPG	APG	SPG	BPG	TO	PPG
2023	Atlanta	1	0	3.0	.000	—	.000	.0	.0	.0	.0	**.0**	.0
2024	Atlanta	1	0	10.0	**.600**	—	.500	**5.0**	.0	.0	**1.0**	**.0**	**8.0**
2025	Golden State	1	0	4.0	—	—	—	1.0	.0	.0	.0	**.0**	.0
2026^{†}	Golden State	**5**	0	**10.2**	.500	.000	**.667**	3.6	**.4**	**.4**	.4	.4	2.4
**Career**	4 years, 2 teams	8	0	8.5	.500	.000	.500	3.0	.3	.3	.4	.3	2.5

=== College ===
NCAA statistics
Year	Team	GP	GS	MPG	FG%	3P%	FT%	RPG	APG	SPG	BPG	TO	PPG
2019–20	South Carolina	29	0	12.9	.417	**.538**	.541	3.9	.6	.6	1.1	**1.6**	4.7
2020–21	South Carolina	31	1	**17.9**	.398	.000	.602	**5.5**	.9	.7	**1.2**	2.3	6.8
2021–22*	South Carolina	31	**3**	16.8	.436	.455	.651	3.6	1.2	.6	.8	1.8	6.3
2022–23	South Carolina	**36**	0	15.9	**.487**	.105	**.670**	3.4	**1.3**	**.8**	1.1	**1.6**	**7.1**
**Career**		127	4	15.9	.436	.264	.625	4.1	1.0	.7	1.0	1.8	6.3
