= Miela Sowah =

Australian basketball player (born 2000)

- Sowah with the Australian Opals in 2026

Townsville Fire
- Position: Guard
- League: WNBL

Personal information
- Born: 4 June 2000 (age 26) Brisbane, Queensland, Australia
- Listed height: 5 ft 10 in (1.78 m)
- Listed weight: 148 lb (67 kg)

Career information
- High school: Moreton Bay College (Brisbane, Queensland)
- College: Duke (2018–2022)
- WNBA draft: 2022: undrafted
- Playing career: 2016–present

Career history
- 2016–2017: Logan Thunder
- 2017–2018: Townsville Fire
- 2018: Townsville Flames
- 2022: Mackay Meteorettes
- 2022–2023: Melbourne Boomers
- 2023: Mount Gambier Pioneers
- 2023–2025: Perth Lynx
- 2024: North Gold Coast Seahawks
- 2025: Brisbane Capitals
- 2025–present: Townsville Fire
- 2026: Golden State Valkyries

Career highlights
- WNBA champion (2026); 2× WNBL champion (2018, 2026); 2× All-WNBL Second Team (2025, 2026); NBL1 North First Team (2024); NBL1 South All-Star Five (2023); QBL U-23 Youth Player of the Year (2018); ACC All-Freshman Team (2019)
- Stats at WNBA.com
- Stats at Basketball Reference
Medals
Women's basketball
Representing Australia
Asia Cup
Gold medal – first place	2025 China
Women's 3x3 basketball
Representing Australia
Asia Cup
Gold medal – first place	2025 Singapore	Team

Miela Elizabeth Sowah (née Goodchild; born 4 June 2000) is an Australian professional basketball player for the Townsville Fire of the Women's National Basketball League (WNBL). She debuted in the WNBL in the 2017–18 season as a development player with the Fire, winning a WNBL championship. She then played four seasons of college basketball in the United States for the Duke Blue Devils before returning to the WNBL in 2022. She played a season for the Melbourne Boomers before joining the Perth Lynx in 2023 and then re-joining the Fire in 2025, winning her second WNBL championship in 2026.

Sowah made her Women's National Basketball Association (WNBA) debut in 2026 and was part of the Golden State Valkyries' championship-winning roster.

== Early life and career ==
Sowah was born in Brisbane, Queensland, where she attended Moreton Bay College. She played basketball at Moreton Bay and won numerous sport awards.

As a junior, Sowah played for the Logan Thunder. She was selected the 2016 and 2017 Basketball Queensland Player of the Year and the Logan Basketball Junior Player of the Year. She made her debut for the Thunder in the Queensland Basketball League (QBL) in 2016, playing one game. In 13 games in 2017, she averaged 10.8 points, 2.5 rebounds, 1.8 assists and 1.0 steals per game.

In July 2017, Sowah signed with the Townsville Fire of the Women's National Basketball League (WNBL) as a development player for the 2017–18 season. She appeared in two games during the season as the Fire went on to win the WNBL championship.

For the 2018 QBL season, Sowah joined the Townsville Flames and won the QBL U-23 Youth Player of the Year after averaging 18.0 points, 4.8 rebounds, 2.9 assists and 1.5 steals in 16 games.

== College career ==
Sowah moved to the United States to play college basketball for the Duke Blue Devils of the Atlantic Coast Conference (ACC) in the NCAA Division I. As a freshman in 2018–19, she played 30 games with 22 starts, averaging 10.9 points, 1.9 rebounds, 1.7 assists and 1.0 steals per game. She subsequently earned ACC All-Freshman Team honours. She made a Duke freshman record 73 3-pointers, which also ranked as the eighth-most in the ACC history by a freshman. She had a career-high 26 points with eight 3-pointers against Notre Dame.

As a sophomore in 2019–20, Sowah averaged 7.3 points, 2.3 rebounds, 1.1 steals and 1.0 assists per game. She scored a season-high 26 points against Troy and became the quickest Blue Devil to reach 100 3-pointers, doing so in only 45 contests.

Sowah's junior year was cut short after the team withdrew from the 2020–21 season due to the COVID-19 pandemic after only four games. She averaged 15.3 points, 4.0 rebounds and 1.0 assists per game.

As a senior in 2021–22, Sowah played 29 games with 12 starts, averaging 6.9 points, 3.7 rebounds and 1.5 assists per game.

Sowah concluded her career ranking tied for eighth with 170 career 3-pointers made. She earned ACC All-Academic Team in 2018–19, 2019–20 and 2021–22 and earned ACC Honor Roll in 2018–19, 2019–20 and 2020–21.

== Professional career ==
In May 2022, Sowah returned to Australia and joined the Mackay Meteorettes of the NBL1 North. In seven games during the 2022 NBL1 season, she averaged 19.6 points, 5.9 rebounds, 3.6 assists and 1.0 steals per game.

Sowah joined the Melbourne Boomers for the 2022–23 WNBL season. In 20 games, she averaged 6.1 points and 2.3 rebounds per game.

Following the WNBL season, Sowah joined the Mount Gambier Pioneers of the NBL1 South for the 2023 season. In 21 games, she averaged 24.24 points, 7.0 rebounds, 2.57 assists and 1.67 steals per game. She subsequently earned NBL1 South All-Star Five honours.

On 5 June 2023, Sowah signed with the Perth Lynx for the 2023–24 WNBL season. She suffered a broken nose at training prior to round two which led to her wearing a protective mask for the rest of the season. She was thrust into the role of starting point guard midway through the season following an injury to import Aari McDonald. The Lynx made the WNBL grand final series in 2023–24, where they lost to the Southside Flyers. She averaged 10 points per game for the season.

Sowah joined the North Gold Coast Seahawks of the NBL1 North for the 2024 season. She continued wearing a protective mask in the NBL1 season to protect her nose, mindful that she didn't want to suffer any more damage before her wedding. She was named to the NBL1 North First Team. In 17 games, she averaged 28.88 points, 5.29 rebounds, 2.71 assists and 1.12 steals per game.

On 19 August 2024, Sowah re-signed with the Perth Lynx for the 2024–25 WNBL season. Having played point guard during the 2023–24 season, she entered the 2024–25 season with a focus on being a shooting guard again. On 5 December, she scored a game-high 25 points in a 72–66 loss to the Bendigo Spirit. It was her third successive game with at least 20 points. On 12 December, she scored a game-high 24 points in an 87–63 win over the Canberra Capitals. With three games still remaining in the regular season, she had set a new personal record for the most points in a WNBL campaign. She was named to the All-WNBL Second Team after averaging 15 points per game and helping the Lynx achieve a 16–5 record.

Sowah joined the Brisbane Capitals of the NBL1 North for the 2025 season. On 31 May 2025, she scored 49 points in the Capitals' 91–84 loss to the Southern Districts Spartans. In four games for the Capitals, she averaged 37.0 points, 6.5 rebounds, 4.25 assists and 3.0 steals per game.

On 14 June 2025, Sowah signed a two-year contract with the Townsville Fire, returning to the franchise for a second stint. On 4 November 2025, she scored a WNBL career-high 26 points in a 79–70 win over the Perth Lynx. She was named to the All-WNBL Second Team for the second straight year. In game one of the grand final series against the Lynx, Sowah scored 20 points in an 88–79 win. In game two, she scored 18 points in a 108–105 overtime victory over the Lynx, claiming her second WNBL championship.

In November 2026, Sowah re-joined the Fire for the rest of the 2026–27 WNBL season and played her 100th WNBL game.

=== WNBA ===
==== Golden State Valkyries (2026) ====
Sowah joined the Golden State Valkyries for training camp ahead of the 2026 WNBA season, but was waived prior to the start of the regular season. On 6 May 2026, the Valkyries signed Sowah to one of the team's two Player Development roster spots. On 31 October 2026, the Valkyries were crowned WNBA champions with a game seven WNBA Finals victory over the Atlanta Dream. Sowah did not take the court due to player development contracts being ineligible to feature in the playoffs.

== National team career ==
Sowah debuted for Australia at the 2016 FIBA Under-17 World Championship, where she helped the Sapphires win the gold medal. She went on to play at the 2017 FIBA Under-17 Oceania Championship, 2018 FIBA Under-18 Asian Championship, and 2019 FIBA Under-19 World Cup.

Sowah was a member of the Australian national 3x3 team in May 2023.

In February 2025, Sowah was named in her first Australian Opals squad. The following month, she was named in the Australia 3x3 team for the FIBA 3x3 Champions Cup in Bangkok, Thailand. She helped the Gangurrus win the 3x3 Champions Cup bronze medal and was named to the all-tournament team. Later in March, she helped Australia win gold at the 2025 FIBA 3x3 Asia Cup. In April 2025, she was named in the Opals squad for a trans-Tasman series against New Zealand in May. At the FIBA 3x3 Women's Series in China in early May, she helped the team win silver. She was subsequently selected for the Opals' final squad for the 2025 FIBA Women's Asia Cup in China. In June 2025, she was named in the Australia 3x3 team for the 2025 FIBA 3x3 World Cup in Mongolia. She helped the Opals win gold at the Asia Cup in July.

In August 2026, Sowah was named in the Opals squad as late replacement for Sami Whitcomb for the 2026 FIBA Women's Basketball World Cup.

== Personal life ==
Sowah is the daughter of David and Michelle Goodchild. She has one brother, Conor, and one sister, Briana. Her father and sister appeared on Australian Survivor: Blood V Water in 2022. As of 2025, Briana was the court side announcer for Sydney Flames home games.

After marrying Josh Sowah in September 2024, she dropped her maiden name of Goodchild and entered the 2024–25 WNBL season as Miela Sowah.

== Career statistics ==
Legend
GP	Games played	GS	Games started	MPG	Minutes per game	RPG	Rebounds per game
APG	Assists per game	SPG	Steals per game	BPG	Blocks per game	PPG	Points per game
TO	Turnovers per game	FG%	Field-goal percentage	3P%	3-point field-goal percentage	FT%	Free-throw percentage
**Bold**	Career best	°	League leader

=== WNBA ===
==== Regular season ====
WNBA regular season statistics
Year	Team	GP	GS	MPG	FG%	3P%	FT%	RPG	APG	SPG	BPG	TO	PPG
2026	Golden State	7	0	3.4	.100	.000	—	.7	.0	.0	.0	.6	.3
**Career**	1 year, 1 team	7	0	3.4	.100	.000	—	.7	.0	.0	.0	.6	.3
