= Ashten Prechtel =

American basketball player (born 2001)

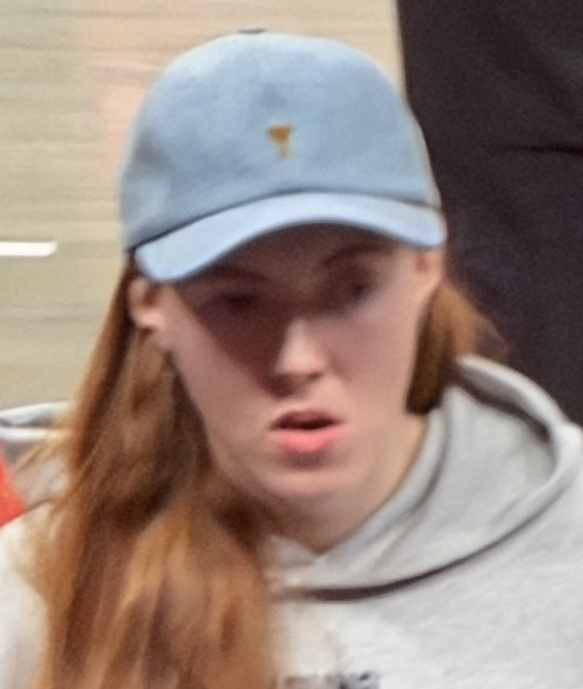
- Prechtel in at a game in 2026

No. 11 – Golden State Valkyries
- Position: Forward
- League: WNBA

Personal information
- Born: May 11, 2001 (age 25) Philadelphia, Pennsylvania, U.S.
- Listed height: 6 ft 5 in (1.96 m)
- Listed weight: 207 lb (94 kg)

Career information
- High school: Discovery Canyon (Colorado Springs, Colorado)
- College: Stanford (2019–2023)
- WNBA draft: 2023: 3rd round, 34th overall pick
- Drafted by: Connecticut Sun
- Playing career: 2024–present

Career history
- 2024–2025: TFSE-MTK Budapest
- 2025–2026: Eneos Sunflowers
- 2026: El Calor de Cancún
- 2026–present: Golden State Valkyries

Career highlights
- WNBA champion (2026); NCAA champion (2021); Pac-12 Sixth Player of the Year (2020); McDonald's All-American (2019)
- Stats at WNBA.com
- Stats at Basketball Reference

Ashten Layne Prechtel (born May 11, 2001) is an American professional basketball player for the Golden State Valkyries of the Women's National Basketball Association (WNBA). She played college basketball at Stanford.

== High school career ==
Prechtel attended Discovery Canyon in Colorado Springs, Colorado, where she played basketball and volleyball. During her senior year she averaged 23.3 points, 7.6 rebounds and 5.3 blocks per game and captained Discovery Canyon to the second round of the Class 4A state playoffs. During the 2018–19 volleyball season she led the state of Colorado in blocks, ranked 13th in state history in single-season blocks, and was named the Discovery Canyon High School Female Athlete of the Year in 2019. On February 19, 2019, she recorded her 1,300th career rebound, setting a new Colorado rebounding record, surpassing the previous record held by Kylee Shook.

During her high school career she appeared in 96 games and averaged 17.3 points, 13.9 rebounds and 4.3 blocks per game. She is Colorado's career rebounding leader with 1,336. She also owns nine school records, including points (career, season, game), three-pointers in a game, rebounds (career, season, game) and blocks (season, game).

=== Recruiting ===
She was rated a five-star recruit by ESPN, and named a McDonald's All-American. In June 2018, she committed to play college basketball at Stanford.

== College career ==
During the 2019–20 season, in her freshman year, she appeared in 32 games, with six starts, and averaged 7.2 points, 4.6 rebounds and 0.9 blocks in 14.3 minutes per game. During the final regular season game of the season against Washington State she recorded a season-high 19 points. Following the season she was named Pac-12 Sixth Player of the Year by the media.

During the 2020–21 season, in her sophomore year, she averaged 5.8 points, 4.5 rebounds, 1.3 assists and 1.1 blocks in 14.1 minutes per game off the bench. During the Elite Eight of the 2021 NCAA tournament against Louisville she scored a season-high 16 points all in the second half to help Stanford advance to the Final Four. In 16 minutes of play, she didn't miss a shot from the field, going 6-of-6. She also had four assists, three rebounds and two blocked shots. During the 2021 NCAA Division I women's basketball championship game she scored seven points, eight rebounds, and three assists and a block in 21 minutes to help Stanford win their third NCAA championship in program history.

During the 2021–22 season, in her junior year, she appeared in 34 games, with three starts, and averaged 2.8 points, 2.4 rebounds and 0.6 blocks in 9.4 minutes per game. During the 2022–23 season, in her senior year, she appeared in 33 games off the bench and averaged 2.4 points, 2.2 rebounds and 0.5 assists in 7.5 minutes per game.

== Professional career ==
On April 10, 2023, Prechtel was drafted in the third round, 34th overall, by the Connecticut Sun in the 2023 WNBA draft.

Prechtel began the 2026 WNBA season with the Phoenix Mercury. During the first pre-season game of the season on April 25, 2026, against the Chicago Sky she recorded nine point and five rebounds in 16 minutes. She was waived by the Mercury on May 6, prior to the start of the regular season. On May 10, she signed a hardship contract with the Golden State Valkyries.

== Personal life ==
Prechtel was born to Elayne and Matt Prechtel, and has two younger brothers, Avery and Aiden. Her mother, played college volleyball at Drexel University, while her father was a professional rower.

== Career statistics ==
Legend
GP	Games played	GS	Games started	MPG	Minutes per game	RPG	Rebounds per game
APG	Assists per game	SPG	Steals per game	BPG	Blocks per game	PPG	Points per game
TO	Turnovers per game	FG%	Field-goal percentage	3P%	3-point field-goal percentage	FT%	Free-throw percentage
**Bold**	Career best	°	League leader

=== WNBA ===
==== Regular season ====
WNBA regular season statistics
Year	Team	GP	GS	MPG	FG%	3P%	FT%	RPG	APG	SPG	BPG	TO	PPG
2026	Golden State	6	0	7.2	.333	.333	1.000	1.8	.5	.2	.7	1.2	1.8
**Career**	1 year, 1 team	6	0	7.2	.333	.333	1.000	1.8	.5	.2	.7	1.2	1.8
