= Veronica Burton =

American basketball player (born 2000)

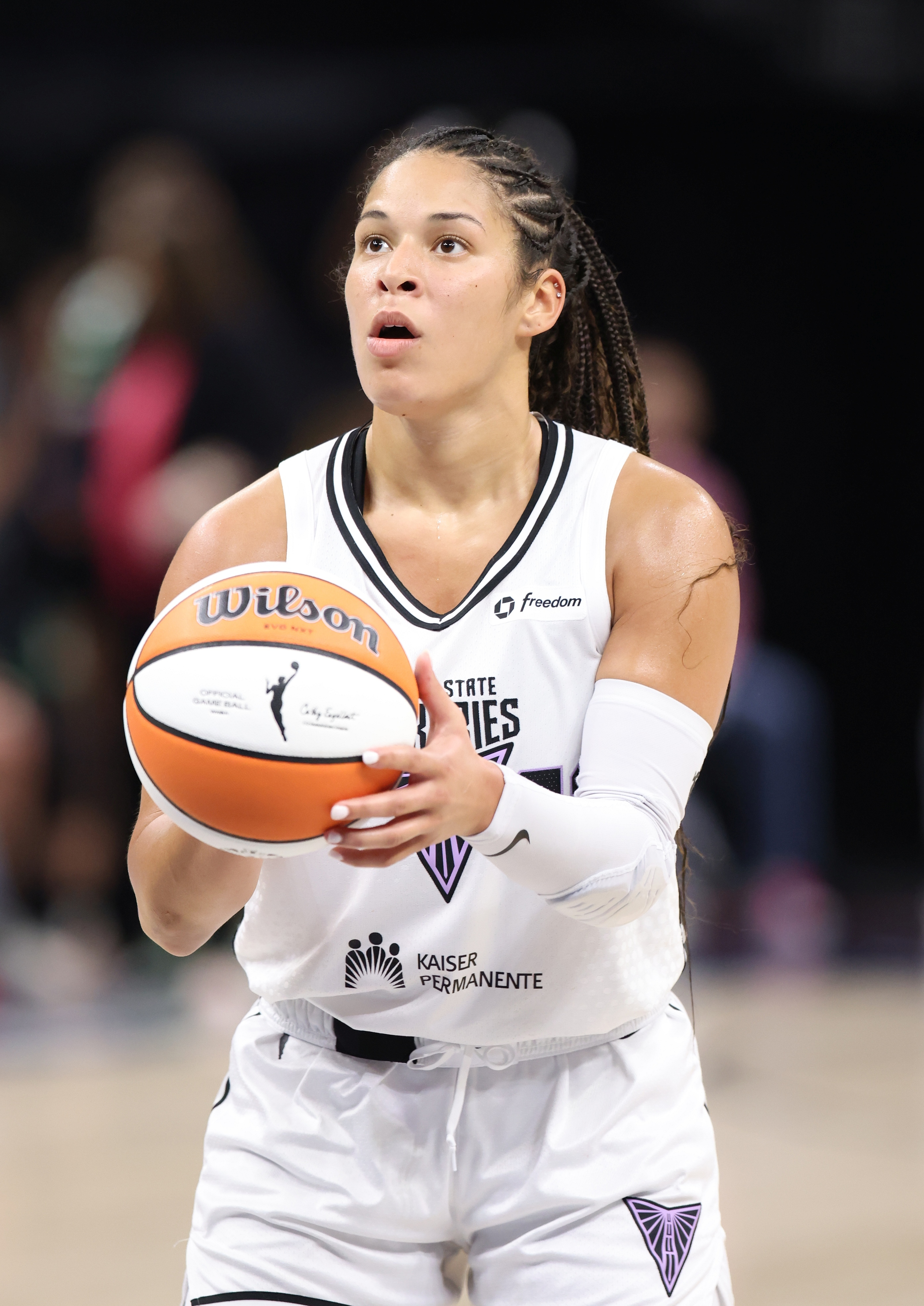
- Burton with the Golden State Valkyries in 2025

No. 22 – Golden State Valkyries
- Position: Point guard
- League: WNBA

Personal information
- Born: July 12, 2000 (age 26) Newton, Massachusetts, U.S.
- Listed height: 5 ft 9 in (1.75 m)
- Listed weight: 155 lb (70 kg)

Career information
- High school: Newton South (Newton, Massachusetts)
- College: Northwestern (2018–2022)
- WNBA draft: 2022: 1st round, 7th overall pick
- Drafted by: Dallas Wings

Career history
- 2022–2023: Dallas Wings
- 2023–2024: AZS UMCS Lublin
- 2024: Connecticut Sun
- 2024–2025: Bendigo Spirit
- 2025–present: Golden State Valkyries
- 2026–present: Mist BC

Career highlights
- WNBA champion (2026); WNBA Most Improved Player (2025); 2× WNBA All-Defensive Second Team (2025, 2026); Unrivaled champion (2026); WNBL champion (2025); All-WNBL Second Team (2025); WNBL Golden Hands Award (2025); WBCA Defensive Player of the Year (2022); Third-team All-American – AP (2022); 3× Big Ten Defensive Player of the Year (2020–2022); 2× First-team All-Big Ten (2021, 2022); Second-team All-Big Ten (2020); 3× Big Ten All-Defensive Team (2020–2022)
- Stats at Basketball Reference
Medals
Women's basketball
Representing the United States
FIBA Women's AmeriCup
| Gold medal – first place | 2021 Puerto Rico |
Women's 3x3 basketball
Representing the United States
FIBA 3x3 AmeriCup
| Gold medal – first place | 2025 León |
| Bronze medal – third place | 2022 Miami |
FIBA 3x3 Under-23 World Cup
| Silver medal – second place | 2022 Bucharest | Team |

Veronica Grace Burton (born July 12, 2000) is an American professional basketball player for the Golden State Valkyries of the Women's National Basketball Association (WNBA) and for Mist of Unrivaled. She played college basketball at Northwestern.

Burton was selected seventh overall in the 2022 WNBA draft by the Dallas Wings. In 2025, she moved to the Valkyries and was named WNBA Most Improved Player.

== College career ==
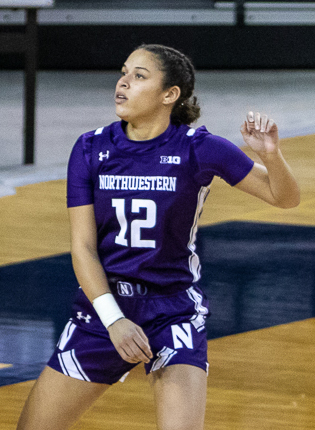
Burton with Northwestern in 2021.

During the 2018–19 season, in her freshman year, she started 31 games and ranked first in the Big Ten in steals (81), second in assist-to-turnover ratio (2.4), and tied for sixteenth in assists per game (3.6). She also led the team in assists (113) and steals (81). During the 2019–20 season, in her sophomore year, she ranked first in the Big Ten in steals (100), second in assist-to-turnover ratio (2.4), fourth in assists (152) and free throw percentage (.793). She also led the team in assists, steals, and free throw percentage. Following an outstanding season, she was named to the Big Ten All-Defensive Team and named Big Ten Defensive Player of the Year.

During the 2020–21 season, in her junior year, she started 24 of 25 games and led the team in points (16.2), assists (4.9) and steals (3.8). Her 3.84 steals per game also led the NCAA. Following an outstanding season, she was named to the Big Ten All-Defensive Team, first-team All-Big Ten and named Big Ten Defensive Player of the Year for the second consecutive year.

On October 21, 2021, Burton was named captain for the 2021–22 season. During her senior year, she averaged 18 points, six assists, five rebounds and four steals per game. Before the NCAA Tournament, she led the nation in total steals and ranked second in steals per game. She also ranked in the top five nationally and led the Big Ten in assist-to-turnover ratio, and ranked sixth nationally in assists per game. Her 117 steals were the third most in a season in Wildcat history and tied for the seventh most in a season in Big Ten history. Following an outstanding season, she was named a unanimous selection to the Big Ten All-Defensive Team and first-team All-Big Ten. She was named the Big Ten Defensive Player of the Year for the third consecutive year, joining Tanisha Wright as the only three-time winner. She was also named the WBCA Defensive Player of the Year and a semifinalist for the Naismith Defensive Player of the Year Award. She was also named a third-team All-American by the Associated Press, and an honorable mention by USBWA. She became the first player in program history to be named to an AP All-America team.

On March 25, 2022, Burton renounced her extra year of eligibility due to the COVID-19 pandemic and declared for the 2022 WNBA draft. She finished her career second-all time in program history in steals with 394, and third all-time in Big Ten history. She also finished third in program history in career assists with 575.

== Professional career ==
=== WNBA ===
==== Dallas Wings (2022–2023) ====
On April 11, 2022, Burton was drafted in the first round, 7th overall, by the Dallas Wings in the 2022 WNBA draft. On May 12, 2024, Burton was waived by the Wings. In two seasons with the Wings, she appeared in 76 regular season games, making 19 starts, while averaging 2.5 points and 2.1 assists per game.

==== Connecticut Sun (2024) ====
On June 5, 2024, Burton signed a rest of season contract with the Connecticut Sun for the 2024 WNBA season. She averaged 3.1 points, 1.4 rebounds and 1.9 assists in 12.7 minutes per game.

==== Golden State Valkyries (2025–present) ====
On December 6, 2024, Burton was selected as the Golden State Valkyries' pick from the Connecticut Sun's roster in the 2024 WNBA expansion draft. During the 2025 WNBA season, she was the only Valkyries player to start all 44 regular-season games and took on even greater responsibilities when the Valkyries lost Kayla Thornton to a season-ending knee injury in July 2025. On August 19, 2025, in a game against the Phoenix Mercury, she became the first player in WNBA history to have at least 24 points and 14 assists with no turnovers in a game. She averaged career highs of 11.9 points, 4.4 rebounds, 6.0 assists and 1.1 steals in 44 games, a drastic improvement from the previous season. She became the first player in WNBA history to increase her averages by at least five points, two rebounds and two assists per game from one season to the next (minimum 30 games played in each season). She finished the regular season ranked third in the WNBA in assists per game and fourth with a 2.82 assist-to-turnover ratio. She was subsequently named the WNBA Most Improved Player. Defensively she helped the Valkyries' that ranked first in opponent points per game (76.3) and opponent shooting percentage (40.5) and third in defensive rating (99.8). She joined Rhyne Howard as the only two guards to average four rebounds, one steal and at least 0.6 blocks per game, and was named to the WNBA All-Defensive Second Team. On April 11, 2026, Burton signed a three-year deal with the Golden State Valkyries. On 31 October, 2026, Burton won the WNBA championship with the Valkyries against the Atlanta Dream in Game 7 of the 2026 WNBA Finals.

=== Unrivaled ===
On November 5th, 2025, it was announced that Burton had been drafted by Mist BC for the 2026 Unrivaled season.

=== Overseas ===
Burton played for AZS UMCS Lublin in the 2023–2024 season.

Burton signed with the Bendigo Spirit for the 2024–25 WNBL season.

== National team career ==
On June 6, 2021, Burton was named to team USA for the 2021 FIBA Women's AmeriCup. During the tournament, she averaged 4.8 points, 3.3 rebounds and 4.0 assists per game, to help lead USA to a gold medal.

== Career statistics ==
Legend
| GP | Games played | GS | Games started | MPG | Minutes per game | FG% | Field goal percentage |
| 3P% | 3-point field goal percentage | FT% | Free throw percentage | RPG | Rebounds per game | APG | Assists per game |
| SPG | Steals per game | BPG | Blocks per game | TO | Turnovers per game | PPG | Points per game |
| **Bold** | Career high | * | Led Division I | ° | Led the league | ‡ | WNBA record |

| † | Denotes season(s) in which Burton won a WNBA championship |

=== WNBA ===
==== Regular season ====
WNBA regular season statistics
| Year | Team | GP | GS | MPG | FG% | 3P% | FT% | RPG | APG | SPG | BPG | TO | PPG |
|---|---|---|---|---|---|---|---|---|---|---|---|---|---|
| 2022 | Dallas | 36 | 6 | 15.2 | .329 | .279 | **1.000** | 1.5 | 1.9 | .9 | .3 | 1.0 | 2.6 |
| 2023 | Dallas | 40 | 13 | 13.9 | .294 | .271 | .912 | 1.8 | 2.2 | .7 | .3 | **.4** | 2.4 |
| 2024 | Connecticut | 31 | 1 | 12.6 | .361 | .351 | .838 | 1.4 | 1.9 | .5 | .2 | .5 | 3.1 |
| 2025 | Golden State | **44** | **44** | **29.4** | .387 | .345 | .878 | **4.4** | **6.0** | 1.1 | **.6** | 2.1 | 11.9 |
| 2026^{†} | Golden State | **44**° | **44**° | 28.6 | **.422** | **.355** | .836 | 3.6 | 5.7 | **1.6** | .5 | 1.5 | **12.2** |
| **Career** | 5 years, 3 teams | 195 | 108 | 20.8 | .387 | .335 | .871 | 2.7 | 3.7 | 1.0 | .4 | 1.2 | 6.9 |

==== Playoffs ====
WNBA playoff statistics
| Year | Team | GP | GS | MPG | FG% | 3P% | FT% | RPG | APG | SPG | BPG | TO | PPG |
|---|---|---|---|---|---|---|---|---|---|---|---|---|---|
| 2022 | Dallas | 3 | 3 | 28.0 | **.400** | .300 | .800 | 2.7 | 3.3 | 2.0° | .3 | 2.0 | 6.3 |
| 2023 | Dallas | 5 | 0 | 11.0 | .154 | .111 | .800 | 1.2 | 2.2 | 1.6 | .0 | **.2** | 1.8 |
| 2024 | Connecticut | 7 | 0 | 19.3 | .323 | .231 | .846 | 1.1 | 1.9 | .6 | .4 | .7 | 4.9 |
| 2025 | Golden State | 2 | 2 | **35.0** | .280 | **.400** | **1.000** | **5.5** | **8.0** | **3.5** | 1.0 | 5.0 | **13.5** |
| 2026^{†} | Golden State | **13** | **13** | 31.6 | .295 | .226 | .833 | 4.9 | 3.8 | 1.2 | **1.1** | 1.5 | 9.2 |
| **Career** | 5 years, 3 teams | 30 | 18 | 25.2 | .296 | .250 | .848 | 3.2 | 3.3 | 1.4 | .7 | 1.4 | 7.0 |

=== College ===
NCAA statistics
| Year | Team | GP | GS | MPG | FG% | 3P% | FT% | RPG | APG | SPG | BPG | TO | PPG |
|---|---|---|---|---|---|---|---|---|---|---|---|---|---|
| 2018–19 | Northwestern | **31** | **31** | 32.0 | .377 | **.368** | **.855** | 3.9 | 3.6 | 2.6 | .4 | **1.5** | 8.6 |
| 2019–20 | Northwestern | 30 | 30 | 32.0 | **.437** | .327 | .793 | 4.9 | 5.1 | 3.3 | .6 | 2.1 | 11.6 |
| 2020–21 | Northwestern | 25 | 24 | 34.8 | .399 | .307 | .795 | 5.2 | 4.9 | 3.8* | .4 | 1.7 | 16.2 |
| 2021–22 | Northwestern | 29 | 29 | **36.5** | .415 | .326 | .833 | **5.5** | **6.4** | **4.0*** | **.9** | 2.1 | **17.8** |
| **Career** | | 115 | 114 | 33.7 | .409 | .332 | .817 | 4.8 | 5.0 | 3.4 | .6 | 1.9 | 13.4 |

== Personal life ==
Her father Steve played quarterback at Northwestern, and is currently a television sports reporter in Boston, while her mother Ginni was an All-American and Big Ten Champion in swimming for the Wildcats. Her sisters, Kendall and Kayla also played college basketball, while her brother, Austin, was a quarterback at Purdue. Her grandfather, Ron Burton, played football for Northwestern and the Boston Patriots and is a College Football Hall of Famer. Burton is a devout Christian and often credits her faith for her success.
