= Lauren Cox =

American basketball player (born 1998)

No. 15 – Townsville Fire
- Position: Power forward
- League: WNBL

Personal information
- Born: April 20, 1998 (age 28) Flower Mound, Texas, U.S.
- Listed height: 6 ft 4 in (1.93 m)
- Listed weight: 205 lb (93 kg)

Career information
- High school: Flower Mound (Flower Mound, Texas)
- College: Baylor (2016–2020)
- WNBA draft: 2020: 1st round, 3rd overall pick
- Drafted by: Indiana Fever
- Playing career: 2020–present

Career history
- 2020–2021: Indiana Fever
- 2021: Los Angeles Sparks
- 2021–2022: IDK Euskotren
- 2022–2023: Valencia Basket
- 2023: Connecticut Sun
- 2023–2024: Virtus Bologna
- 2024–present: Townsville Fire

Career highlights
- Spanish League champion (2023); WNBL Defensive Player of the Year (2025); NCAA champion (2019); Big 12 Player of the Year (2020); First-team All-American – AP, USBWA (2020); WBCA Coaches' All-American (2020); Pat Summitt Most Courageous Award (2020); Third-team All-American – AP, USBWA (2019); 2× Big 12 Defensive Player of the Year (2018, 2019); 3× Big 12 All-Defensive Team (2018–2020); 3× First-team All-Big 12 (2018–2020); Big 12 Sixth Player of the Year (2017); Big 12 All-Freshman team (2017); McDonald's All-American (2016); FIBA Under-18 Americas Championship MVP (2016)
- Stats at Basketball Reference
Medals
Representing United States
Women's basketball
FIBA Under-18 Americas Championship
Gold medal – first place	2016 Chile	Team
FIBA Under-19 World Cup
Gold medal – first place	2015 Russia	Team
FIBA Under-17 World Cup
Gold medal – first place	2014 Czech Republic	Team
FIBA Americas Under-16 Championship
Gold medal – first place	2013 Mexico	Team

Lauren Elizabeth Cox (born April 20, 1998) is an American professional basketball player for the Townsville Fire of the Women's National Basketball League (WNBL). She played college basketball for the Baylor Lady Bears.

== High school career ==
Cox was one of the top-rated high school basketball players in the country. She was the 2016 Women's Basketball Coaches Association High School Player of the Year.

== College career ==
She played college basketball for the Baylor Lady Bears. She was named a preseason All-American by Lindy's Sports, Athlon Sports, and Street & Smith prior to the 2019 season beginning. In November 2019, ESPN ranked Cox as the second-best collegiate women's basketball player in the country behind Sabrina Ionescu. She would be named Big 12 Player of the Year that season.

== Professional career ==
Cox was drafted by the Indiana Fever with the third overall pick in the 2020 WNBA draft. She played 14 games during the 2020 WNBA Hub season, averaging 3.6 points and 3.3 rebounds. During the 2021 WNBA season, she played in 11 games for the Fever before being waived on June 27, 2021. Three days later, she signed with the Los Angeles Sparks, finishing the season with them by playing in 15 games and averaging 3.5 points and 3.7 rebounds.

For the 2021–22 season, Cox joined IDK Euskotren of the Spanish Liga Femenina de Baloncesto. For the 2022–23 season, she remained in Spain and joined Valencia Basket.

Cox had a one-game stint with the Connecticut Sun during the 2023 WNBA season.

For the 2023–24 season, Cox joined Virtus Bologna of the Lega Basket Femminile.

Cox joined the Townsville Fire of the Women's National Basketball League (WNBL) in Australia for the 2024–25 season. She was named WNBL Defensive Player of the Year. She re-joined the Fire for the 2025–26 season, but suffered a season-ending injury on New Year's Eve.

== Career statistics ==
Legend
GP	Games played	GS	Games started	MPG	Minutes per game	RPG	Rebounds per game
APG	Assists per game	SPG	Steals per game	BPG	Blocks per game	PPG	Points per game
TO	Turnovers per game	FG%	Field-goal percentage	3P%	3-point field-goal percentage	FT%	Free-throw percentage
**Bold**	Career best	°	League leader

=== WNBA ===
==== Regular season ====
Year	Team	GP	GS	MPG	FG%	3P%	FT%	RPG	APG	SPG	BPG	TO	PPG
2020	Indiana	14	**1**	13.1	**.419**	**.500**	.733	3.3	**1.4**	0.4	0.3	0.8	**3.6**
2021	Indiana	11	0	8.6	.316	.333	**1.000**	2.0	0.3	0.4	0.3	0.6	1.4
2021	Los Angeles	**15**	0	**14.0**	.413	.200	.778	**3.7**	0.6	**0.7**	**0.9**	0.6	3.5
2023	Connecticut	1	0	0.0	—	—	—	0.0	0.0	0.0	0.0	0.0	0.0
Career	2 years, 2 teams	41	1	11.9	.398	.357	.771	3.0	0.8	0.5	0.5	0.7	2.9

=== College ===
Year	Team	GP	GS	MPG	FG%	3P%	FT%	RPG	APG	SPG	BPG	TO	PPG
2016–17	Baylor	37	1	13.4	.433	**.412**	.747	4.1	1.2	0.4	1.4	**1.1**	7.6
2017–18	Baylor	34	34	30.2	.516	.304	**.748**	**9.7**	2.9	1.1	2.7	1.7	**15.3**
2018–19	Baylor	**38**	**38**	29.5	**.522**	.306	.734	8.3	**3.7**	0.8	2.6	1.5	13.0
2019–20*	Baylor	22	22	30.2	.463	.333	.614	8.4	3.6	**1.3**	2.7	1.6	12.5
Career		131	95	25.2	.492	.322	.725	7.5	2.8	0.8	2.3	1.5	12.0

* 2020 NCAA tournament canceled due to COVID-19 pandemic

== Personal life ==
Cox was diagnosed with type 1 diabetes at the age of 7. She wears an insulin pump during games. In each season of Cox's Baylor career, the Lady Bears played a preseason type 1 diabetes benefit game. The 2019 edition of the game, in Cox's final season at Baylor, was especially significant for her personally, as the opponent was defending NCAA Division II champion Lubbock Christian, which featured her younger sister Whitney—who had been diagnosed with the disease at age 17—as a freshman reserve. Near the end of the 2019–20 season, the United States Basketball Writers Association announced that both sisters would receive the Pat Summitt Most Courageous Award for their basketball and community involvement in the face of their condition.
