= Saffron Shiels =

Australian basketball player (born 2006)

No. 2 – Southside Melbourne Flyers
- Position: Guard
- League: WNBL

Personal information
- Born: January 18, 2006 (age 20) Newcastle, New South Wales, Australia
- Listed height: 6 ft 2 in (1.88 m)

Career information
- High school: Hunter Sports (Gateshead, New South Wales)
- WNBA draft: 2026: 2nd round, 26th overall pick

Career history
- 2023: BA Centre of Excellence
- 2023–2024: Townsville Fire
- 2024: Townsville Flames
- 2024–2026: Townsville Fire
- 2025: Knox Raiders
- 2026: Newcastle Falcons
- 2026–: Southside Melbourne Flyers

Career highlights
- WNBL champion (2026); Nike Hoop Summit (2025); Second-team All-NBL1 North (2024); NBL1 North Youth Player of the Year (2024)
- Stats at Basketball Reference
Medals
Women's basketball
Representing Australia
FIBA U18 Asian Championship
Gold medal – first place	2022 India	Team
Gold medal – first place	2024 China	Team
FIBA U17 Oceania Championship
Gold medal – first place	2023 Papua New Guinea	Team
FIBA U16 Asian Championship
Gold medal – first place	2022 Jordan	Team

Saffron Shiels (born January 18, 2006) is an Australian professional basketball player for the Southside Melbourne Flyers of the Women's National Basketball League (WNBL). She was selected in the second round of the 2026 WNBA draft by the Toronto Tempo.

After winning several gold medals at the youth level with Australia, she made her senior international debut with the Australian national team in 2023 at the age of 17.

== Early life ==
Shiels, a native of Newcastle, New South Wales, began playing basketball at age six after attending a camp with her brother. Both were very competitive and grew up playing against each other in the backyard. Shiels helped her primary school win the New South Wales PSSA girls basketball championship in 2016. She later attended Hunter Sports High School, whom she also led to a state title. At club level, Shiels rose up the ranks of the Newcastle Hunters youth system. She was selected to represent New South Wales in the U16 Australian Junior Championships in 2020 and 2021, though the competition was cancelled both years due to the COVID-19 pandemic.

== Professional career ==
In late 2021, Shiels was one of four athletes awarded a scholarship to the BA Centre of Excellence women's program for the following year, where she further developed her game. Shiels played with their NBL1 East squad in 2023. She averaged 10.9 points, 6.2 rebounds and 2.7 assists per game as a 17-year-old.

Shiels signed her first professional contract with the Townsville Fire of the Women's National Basketball League (WNBL) in July 2023. In her rookie WNBL season in 2023–24, she made 14 appearances for the Fire in a limited role, averaging two points per game. Shiels then joined the Townsville Flames of the NBL1 North for the 2024 season. She was a second-team All-NBL1 North selection in addition to being named the NBL1 North Youth Player of the Year, and earned an invite to the 2024 Basketball Without Borders Global girls camp in Phoenix, Arizona.

Shiels re-joined the Fire for the 2024–25 WNBL season. She played 23 games and averaged 5.4 points, 3.0 rebounds, and 2.5 assists per game. She signed with the Knox Raiders of the NBL1 South ahead the 2025 season. Shiels then represented Team World at the 2025 Nike Hoop Summit that April, recording eight points, eight rebounds, three assists in a 78–90 to Team USA. However, the following month, she underwent ankle surgery to repair a chronic injury in her left foot, keeping her sidelined for a year following the Nike Hoop Summit.

Shiels remained on the Fire's roster during its WNBL title-winning season in 2025–26, but did not suit up for the team due to her injury.

On April 13, 2026, Shiels was selected in the second round, 26th overall, in the 2026 WNBA draft by the Toronto Tempo, an expansion team coached by Australia women's national team head coach Sandy Brondello. According to ESPN, she planned to finish her rehab and play in Australia for another year before joining the Tempo, saying: "I want to be as ready and prepared as possible to go over because it's such a hard league to make. I just want to get healthy first".

On May 26, 2026, Shiels signed with the Southside Melbourne Flyers for the 2026-27 WNBL season.

== National team career ==
=== Youth ===
In 2022, Shiels represented Australia at both the under-16 and under-18 levels. At the 2022 FIBA U16 Women's Asian Championship, she averaged 11 points, 7.7 rebounds, and five assists per game, helping Australia win the gold medal. Shiels next played in the 2022 FIBA Under-17 Women's Basketball World Cup, where she averaged 11.1 points, 4.9 rebounds, and 4.9 assists per game as Australia finished in fifth place. She then jumped up an age group at the 2022 FIBA U18 Women's Asian Championship and won another gold medal after averaging 4.2 points and 4.2 rebounds per game.

Shiels again played up an age group at the 2023 FIBA Under-19 Women's Basketball World Cup; she averaged 1.9 points per game as the Gems placed ninth. Later that year, she helped Australia to a gold medal at the 2023 FIBA Under-17 Women's Oceania Championship after averaging 19.5 points, 8.5 rebounds, and 2.8 assists per game.

Shiels won her fourth international gold medal at the 2024 FIBA U18 Women's Asia Cup, averaging 18 points, 11.6 rebounds, and 3.8 assists per game en route to earning all-tournament honors. In the final, she recorded 31 points, 15 rebounds, and six assists in a 96–79 win over China, led by a 7 ft 3 in (2.21 m) Zhang Ziyu.

=== Senior ===
In 2023, Shiels debuted for the senior national team during a five-game exhibition tour series against China, becoming one of the youngest players in national team history at age 17. She said of the experience: "It was so cool. Everyone wants to play for the Opals and not many people my age can say they did it that young."

== Personal life ==
Shiels is the daughter of former rugby league player Peter Shiels, who won a Super League title with St Helens R.F.C. She has a brother named Noah and a sister named Ruby. During her rookie WNBL season, Shiels completed her final year of high school studies online.
