= Yemiyah Morris =

American basketball player (born 1998)

No. 20 – Joondalup Wolves
- Position: Center
- League: NBL1 West

Personal information
- Born: November 27, 1998 (age 27) San Bernardino, California, U.S.
- Listed height: 6 ft 6 in (1.98 m)

Career information
- High school: Cajon (San Bernardino, California); Lakewood (St. Petersburg, Florida); Canyon Springs (North Las Vegas, Nevada)
- College: Cochise College (2017–2019); Mississippi State (2019–2021); West Virginia (2021–2022)
- WNBA draft: 2022: undrafted
- Playing career: 2022–present

Career history
- 2022–2023: AO Dafni Agioy Dimitriou
- 2023: Elazığ İl Özel İdarespor
- 2023–2024: DSK Levhartice Chomutov
- 2024: Elitzur Ramla
- 2024: Taiyuan Textile
- 2024–2025: Sydney Flames
- 2025: Rojas de Veracruz
- 2025–2026: Perth Lynx
- 2026–present: Joondalup Wolves

Career highlights
- First Team All-ACCAC (2019); Third-team All-ACCAC (2018)
Medals
Representing United States
Women's basketball
FISU World University Games
Silver medal – second place	2019 Italy	Team competition

Yemiyah Aiyanna Morris (born November 27, 1998) is an American professional basketball player for the Joondalup Wolves of the NBL1 West. She played college basketball for Cochise College, Mississippi State and West Virginia. In her professional career, she has played in Greece, Turkey, Czech Republic, Israel, Taiwan, Australia and Mexico.

== Early life ==
Morris was born in San Bernardino, California. She attended three different high schools growing up, living in California, Florida and Nevada. As a freshman, she attended Cajon High School in San Bernardino, before moving to St. Petersburg, Florida, where she attended Lakewood High School. She played junior varsity basketball at Lakewood during her sophomore year and was honorable mention All-Pinellas County as a junior. In August 2016, Morris moved to Las Vegas Valley with her mother who was being treated for a heart condition. As a senior at Canyon Springs High School in North Las Vegas, Nevada, she earned first-team All-Northeast League and honorable mention all-state honors after averaging 12.3 points, 8.2 rebounds and 4.7 blocked shots per game.

== College career ==
After initially signing with Grays Harbor College in Aberdeen, Washington, Morris joined Cochise College in Arizona, where she played between 2017 and 2019.

As a freshman in 2017–18, Morris averaged 9.4 points and 6.3 rebounds per game and was 12th in the nation with 74 blocks. She was named Second Team All-Region 1 and earned Third Team All-ACCAC recognition after helping Cochise reach the national championship tournament.

As a sophomore in 2018–19, Morris earned First Team All-ACCAC honors after averaging 13.9 points and 8.7 rebounds per game while ranking second in blocks. She helped the Apaches win the 2019 Region I championship with a 28–4 record and reach the national championship tournament.

In April 2019, Morris signed with the Mississippi State Bulldogs.

As a junior in 2019–20, Morris played in 29 games for the Bulldogs and averaged 3.4 points, 2.4 rebounds and 1.1 blocks in 9.0 minutes per game. In the semifinals of the SEC Tournament, she posted the first double-double of her career with 11 points, 10 rebounds and five blocks in a win over Kentucky. She finished with a season-high 14 points on 6-of-7 shooting in win over Murray State.

As a senior in 2020–21, Morris played in 19 games for the Bulldogs and averaged 3.2 points and 2.5 rebounds in 8.2 minutes per game. She matched her career high in scoring with 14 points against New Orleans on December 2, 2020.

In March 2021, Morris joined the West Virginia Mountaineers as a graduate transfer.

In the 2021–22 season, Morris played 25 games for the Mountaineers with four starts and averaged 3.3 points and 2.4 rebounds in 7.7 minutes per game.

== Professional career ==
Morris made her professional debut with AO Dafni Agioy Dimitriou of the Greek Women's Basketball League in the 2022–23 season. In 23 games, she averaged 15.0 points, 11.1 rebounds, 1.6 assists, 1.7 steals and 3.5 blocks per game. In March 2023, she joined Elazığ İl Özel İdarespor of the Turkish Women's Basketball Super League for the rest of the season. In eight games, she averaged 19.5 points, 12.9 rebounds, 1.3 steals and 2.5 blocks per game.

For the 2023–24 season, Morris joined DSK Levhartice Chomutov of the Czech Women's Basketball League. She left the team in January 2024 after appearing in 10 league games, averaging 6.0 points, 7.2 rebounds and 1.6 blocks per game. She also appeared in three EuroCup games, averaging 5.3 points, 6.0 rebounds and 2.0 blocks. She subsequently joined Elitzur Ramla of the Israeli Women's Basketball Premier League, playing in six games between January 22 and March 11, averaging 11.3 points, 8.3 rebounds, 1.0 assists and 1.7 blocks per game. In March 2024, she joined Taiyuan Textile of the Taiwanese Women's Super Basketball League. In 16 games, she averaged 11.6 points, 10.2 rebounds and 2.1 blocks per game.

On September 13, 2024, Morris signed with the Sydney Flames of the Women's National Basketball League (WNBL) in Australia for the 2024–25 season. In 19 games, she averaged 7.0 points, 5.5 rebounds and 1.5 blocks per game.

In May 2025, Morris had an eight-game stint with Rojas de Veracruz of the Mexican LNBPF, averaging 1.9 points and 4.1 rebounds per game.

On 16 September 2025, Morris signed with the Perth Lynx for the 2025–26 WNBL season. She helped the Lynx reach the WNBL grand final series, where they lost 2–0 to the Townsville Fire.

Morris joined the Joondalup Wolves of the NBL1 West for the 2026 season.

== National team ==
Morris helped Team USA win the silver medal at the 2019 World University Games, averaging 6.3 points, 6.4 rebounds and 0.7 blocks per game.

== Personal life ==
Morris is the daughter of Yema Manley and Angelo Morris. She has four siblings: Tyanna, Atonie, Tyrone and An'Taniyah.
