= 2026 Washington Mystics season =

- Head coach: Sydney Johnson
- Arena: CareFirst Arena; Capital One Arena

Results
- Record: 28–16 (.636)
- Place: 2nd (Eastern)
- Playoff finish: 5th seed Lost in First Round 0–2 to Atlanta Dream

The 2026 Washington Mystics season was the franchise's 29th season in the Women's National Basketball Association and their second under head coach Sydney Johnson. The Mystics qualified for the 2026 WNBA playoffs as the fifth seed, but lost in the first round to the Atlanta Dream through a two-game sweep.

== Draft ==
The draft was held on April 13, 2026, at 7:30 pm EDT, and broadcast on ESPN.

Round	Pick	Player	Position	Nationality	College/Club	Outcome	Ref.
1	4	Lauren Betts	C	United States	UCLA	Main Roster	
1	9	Angela Dugalić	F	Serbia	UCLA	Main Roster	
1	11	Cotie McMahon	F/G	United States	Ole Miss	Main Roster	
2	19	Cassandre Prosper	G	Canada	Notre Dame	Main Roster	
2	30	Darianna Littlepage-Buggs	F	United States	Baylor	Developmental contract	
3	34	Rori Harmon	G	United States	Texas	Main Roster	

== Transactions ==
=== Front office and coaching ===
Date	Details	Ref.
April 6, 2026	Fired general manager, Jamila Wideman	
April 6, 2026	In addition to his role as head Coach, Sydney Johnson becomes general manager	

=== Trades ===
April
April 11	To Washington Mystics 2028 first-round pick	To Chicago Sky Jacy Sheldon

== Roster ==
Washington Mystics roster
Players
Coaches

Pos.	No.	Nat.	Name	Height	Weight	DOB	From	Yrs
G	8	(Australia)	Amoore, Georgia	5' 6" (1.68m)	155 lb (70kg)	2001-04-03	Kentucky	R
F/C	0	(United States)	Austin, Shakira	6' 5" (1.96m)	200 lb (91kg)	2000-07-25	Mississippi	4
C	51	(United States)	Betts, Lauren	6' 7" (2.01m)		2003-10-15	UCLA	R
G/F	22	(United States)	Citron, Sonia	6' 1" (1.85m)		2003-10-22	Notre Dame	1
F	32	(Serbia)	Dugalić, Angela	6' 4" (1.93m)		2001-12-29	UCLA	R
G	2	(Spain)	Flórez, Alicia	5' 9" (1.75m)		2004-04-19	Spain	R
G	3	(United States)	Harmon, Rori	5' 6" (1.68m)		2003-01-29	Texas	R
F	44	(United States)	Iriafen, Kiki	6' 3" (1.91m)		2003-08-26	USC	1
G/F	-	(United States)	Laney-Hamilton, Betnijah	6' 0" (1.83m)	166 lb (75kg)	1993-10-29	Rutgers	9
G	33	(United States)	Olsen, Lucy	5' 10" (1.78m)		2003-05-26	Iowa	1
F	12	(United States)	Onyenwere, Michaela	6' 0" (1.83m)	178 lb (81kg)	1999-08-10	UCLA	5
G/F	5	(United States)	Littlepage-Buggs, Darianna	6' 1" (1.85m)		2003-09-23	Baylor	R
G	23	(United States)	McMahon, Cotie	6' 0" (1.83m)		2004-05-04	Mississippi	R
G	18	(Canada)	Prosper, Cassandre	6' 3" (1.91m)		2005-06-25	Notre Dame	R

Head coach
(United States) Sydney Johnson (Princeton)
Assistant coaches
(United States) Jessie Miller (UIC)
(United States) Barbara Turner (Connecticut)
(Turkey) Emre Vatansever

Legend

- (C) Team captain
- (DP) Unsigned draft pick
- (FA) Free agent
- (S) Suspended
- Injured

WNBA roster page

East
ATL
CHI
CON
IND
NY
TOR
WAS
West
DAL
GS
LV
LA
MIN
PHO
POR
SEA

=== Depth ===
Pos.	Starter	Bench
PG	Georgia Amoore	Lucy Olsen; Rori Harmon
SG	Sonia Citron	Alicia Flórez
SF	Cotie McMahon	Michaela Onyenwere; Cassandre Prosper; Darianna Littlepage-Buggs
PF	Kiki Iriafen	Angela Dugalić
C	Shakira Austin	Lauren Betts

== Schedule ==
=== Preseason ===
2026 pre-season game log
Total: 1–1 (Home: 0–1; Road: 1–0)
April / May: 1–1 (Home: 0–1; Road: 1–0)

Game	Date	Team	Score	High points	High rebounds	High assists	Location Attendance	Record
1	April 25	Minnesota	L 66–77	Lauren Betts (13)	Betts, Dugalić, Prosper (5)	Amoore, Citron, McMahon, Olsen, Prosper (2)	CareFirst Arena; 4,200	0–1
2	May 3	@ Atlanta	W 83–72	Lauren Betts (17)	Angela Dugalić (6)	Rori Harmon (4)	Gateway Center Arena; 3.229	1–1

2026 pre-season schedule

=== Regular season ===
2026 game log
Total: 28–16 (Home: 15–7; Road: 13–9)
May: 3–4 (Home: 0–2; Road: 3–2)

Game	Date	Team	Score	High points	High rebounds	High assists	Location Attendance	Record
1	May 8	@ Toronto	W 68–65	Sonia Citron (26)	Kiki Iriafen (16)	Georgia Amoore (3)	Coca-Cola Coliseum; 8,210	1–0
2	May 10	New York	L 93–98 (OT)	Kiki Iriafen (20)	Kiki Iriafen (12)	Georgia Amoore (7)	CareFirst Arena; 4,200	1–1
3	May 15	@ Indiana	W 104–102 (OT)	Sonia Citron (30)	Kiki Iriafen (13)	Shakira Austin (5)	Gainbridge Fieldhouse; 15,673	2–1
4	May 18	@ Dallas	L 69–92	Shakira Austin (12)	Kiki Iriafen (10)	Amoore, Prosper (3)	College Park Center; 6,251	2–2
5	May 24	@ Seattle	L 85–97	Sonia Citron (16)	Sonia Citron (5)	Georgia Amoore (6)	Climate Pledge Arena; 10,559	2–3
6	May 27	@ Seattle	W 78–64	Shakira Austin (18)	Shakira Austin (13)	Shakira Austin (5)	Climate Pledge Arena; 9,202	3–3
7	May 29	Los Angeles	L 87–92	Shakira Austin (25)	Shakira Austin (10)	Sonia Citron (8)	CareFirst Arena; 4,200	3–4

June : 6–5 (Home: 3–2; Road: 3–3)

Game	Date	Team	Score	High points	High rebounds	High assists	Location Attendance	Record
8	June 2	Chicago	W 90–72	Shakira Austin (17)	Kiki Iriafen (11)	Cotie McMahon (4)	CareFirst Arena; 4,200	4–4
9	June 6	@ Atlanta	L 77–109	Kiki Iriafen (24)	Angela Dugalić (9)	Sonia Citron (6)	Gateway Center Arena; 3,609	4–5
10	June 8	Indiana	L 76–78	Michaela Onyenwere (17)	Shakira Austin (9)	Sonia Citron (5)	CareFirst Arena; 4,200	4–6
11	June 12	Toronto	W 86–85	Lauren Betts (18)	Shakira Austin (11)	Georgia Amoore (7)	CareFirst Arena; 4,200	5–6
12	June 14	@ New York	L 64–86	Michaela Onyenwere (17)	Austin, Betts, Dugalić (6)	Alicia Flórez (6)	Barclays Center; 17,581	5–7
13	June 17	@ Connecticut	W 88–81	Sonia Citron (26)	Sonia Citron (11)	Citron, McMahon (4)	Mohegan Sun Arena; 6,943	6–7
14	June 19	@ New York	W 86–83	Kiki Iriafen (20)	Shakira Austin (7)	Amoore, Citron (8)	Barclays Center; 16,539	7–7
15	June 21	@ Minnesota	W 84–79	Sonia Citron (21)	Shakira Austin (8)	Georgia Amoore (7)	Target Center; 11,610	8–7
16	June 24	Minnesota	L 76–78	Sonia Citron (28)	Shakira Austin (16)	Amoore, Austin, Citron, Iriafen (3)	CareFirst Arena; 4,200	8–8
17	June 26	@ Connecticut	L 57–68	Georgia Amoore (14)	Kiki Iriafen (14)	Georgia Amoore (5)	Mohegan Sun Arena; 7,789	8–9
18	June 28	Portland	W 124–123 (4OT)	Sonia Citron (32)	Shakira Austin (13)	Austin, Iriafen (6)	CareFirst Arena; 4,200	9–9

July : 7–3 (Home: 5–2; Road: 2–1)

Game	Date	Team	Score	High points	High rebounds	High assists	Location Attendance	Record
19	July 2	Atlanta	W 81–76	Shakira Austin (21)	Kiki Iriafen (10)	Alicia Flórez (7)	CareFirst Arena; 4,200	10–9
20	July 6	Golden State	L 49–62	Kiki Iriafen (12)	Shakira Austin (11)	Betts, Flórez, McMahon, Olsen (3)	CareFirst Arena; 4,200	10–10
21	July 12	Seattle	W 84–79	Shakira Austin (27)	Kiki Iriafen (13)	Amoore, Flórez (4)	CareFirst Arena; 4,200	11–10
22	July 14	@ Toronto	W 79–62	Kiki Iriafen (25)	Kiki Iriafen (14)	Alicia Flórez (5)	Coca-Cola Coliseum; 8,210	12–10
23	July 16	Portland	L 56–75	Shakira Austin (19)	Shakira Austin (9)	Shakira Austin (4)	CareFirst Arena; 4,200	12–11
24	July 18	@ Golden State	L 69–74	Shakira Austin (18)	Shakira Austin (16)	Michaela Onyenwere (5)	Chase Center; 18,064	12–12
25	July 20	@ Golden State	W 90–82	Kiki Iriafen (23)	Shakira Austin (15)	Georgia Amoore (8)	Chase Center; 18,064	13–12
26	July 22	Las Vegas	W 100–99	Shakira Austin (25)	Kiki Iriafen (10)	Sonia Citron (8)	CareFirst Arena; 4,200	14–12
All-Star Game
27	July 28	Connecticut	W 92–84	Sonia Citron (22)	Kiki Iriafen (10)	Georgia Amoore (5)	CareFirst Arena; 4,200	15–12
28	July 31	Dallas	W 81–75	Shakira Austin (28)	Shakira Austin (10)	Sonia Citron (5)	CareFirst Arena; 4,200	16–12

August : 8–4 (Home: 5–1; Road: 3–3)

Game	Date	Team	Score	High points	High rebounds	High assists	Location Attendance	Record
29	August 5	Dallas	W 96–92	Shakira Austin (27)	Shakira Austin (13)	Georgia Amoore (5)	CareFirst Arena; 4,200	17–12
30	August 7	Atlanta	W 79–74	Shakira Austin (21)	Austin, Betts (11)	Kiki Iriafen (5)	CareFirst Arena; 4,200	18–12
31	August 9	Phoenix	W 95–75	Austin, Citron (19)	Shakira Austin (11)	Amoore, Citron (6)	CareFirst Arena; 4,200	19–12
32	August 11	@ Las Vegas	L 76–86	Shakira Austin (20)	Kiki Iriafen (13)	Georgia Amoore (4)	Michelob Ultra Arena; 10,224	19–13
33	August 13	@ Las Vegas	L 76–83	Shakira Austin (29)	Shakira Austin (8)	Sonia Citron (8)	Michelob Ultra Arena; 10,215	19–14
34	August 15	Los Angeles	W 80–70	Sonia Citron (21)	Shakira Austin (11)	Sonia Citron (8)	CareFirst Arena; 4,200	20–14
35	August 19	Toronto	W 93–82	Kiki Iriafen (21)	Kiki Iriafen (13)	Sonia Citron (6)	CareFirst Arena; 4,200	21–14
36	August 21	Minnesota	L 84–94	Kiki Iriafen (19)	Kiki Iriafen (13)	Shakira Austin (6)	CareFirst Arena; 4,200	21–15
37	August 23	@ Portland	W 105–100	Shakira Austin (31)	Austin, Iriafen (10)	Sonia Citron (6)	Moda Center; 14,860	22–15
38	August 25	@ Phoenix	W 94–84	Sonia Citron (19)	Kiki Iriafen (10)	Sonia Citron (9)	Mortgage Matchup Center; 10,459	23–15
39	August 27	@ Phoenix	W 80–73	Georgia Amoore (25)	Kiki Iriafen (12)	Betnijah Laney-Hamilton (7)	Mortgage Matchup Center; 9,040	24–15
40	August 28	@ Los Angeles	L 82–88	Sonia Citron (22)	Austin,Iriafen (10)	Georgia Amoore (5)	Crypto.com Arena; 12,551	24–16

September : 4–0 (Home: 2–0; Road: 2–0)

Game	Date	Team	Score	High points	High rebounds	High assists	Location Attendance	Record
41	September 17	@ Chicago	W 110–80	Shakira Austin (20)	Kiki Iriafen (11)	Georgia Amoore (5)	Wintrust Arena; 8,945	25–16
42	September 20	@ Indiana	W 93–77	Kiki Iriafen (21)	Kiki Iriafen (14)	Sonia Citron (10)	Gainbridge Fieldhouse; 17,274	26–16
43	September 22	Connecticut	W 79–69	Shakira Austin (25)	Shakira Austin (13)	Amoore, Citron (3)	CareFirst Arena; 4,200	27–16
44	September 24	Chicago	W 101–93	Sonia Citron (21)	Kiki Iriafen (15)	Austin, Citron (5)	Capital One Arena; 9,798	28–16

2026 season schedule

Notes:

- Games highlighted in represent Commissioner's Cup games.

=== Playoffs ===
2026 playoff game log
First Round vs. Atlanta Dream
Lost Series 0–2

Game	Date	Team	Score	High points	High rebounds	High assists	Location Attendance	Series
1	September 27	@ Dream	L 77–92	Sonia Citron (25)	Shakira Austin (16)	Amoore, Citron, McMahon (3)	State Farm Arena; 9,766	0–1
2	September 30	Atlanta	L 75–93	Sonia Citron (25)	Kiki Iriafen (16)	Georgia Amoore (4)	CareFirst Arena; 4,200	0–2

2026 playoff schedule

== Standings ==
#	Team	W	L	PCT	GB	Conf.	Home	Road	Cup
1	y — Minnesota Lynx	33	11	.750	–	20–3	15–7	18–4	6–1
2	x — Golden State Valkyries	32	12	.727	1	15–8	17–5	15–7	5–2
3	x — Las Vegas Aces	31	13	.705	2	17–6	15–7	16–6	6–1
4	x — Atlanta Dream	30	14	.682	3	15–5	15–7	15–7	4–2
5	x — Washington Mystics	28	16	.636	5	15–5	15–7	13–9	3–3
6	x — Indiana Fever	28	16	.636	5	14–6	15–7	13–9	5–1
7	x — Dallas Wings	27	17	.614	6	13–10	16–6	11–11	4–3
8	cx – New York Liberty	26	18	.591	7	13–7	14–8	12–10	6–0
9	e — Portland Fire	17	27	.386	16	7–16	9–13	8–14	2–5
10	e — Phoenix Mercury	16	28	.364	17	10–13	7–15	9–13	2–5
11	e — Chicago Sky	16	28	.364	17	4–16	11–11	5–17	1–5
12	e — Los Angeles Sparks	16	28	.364	17	9–14	8–14	8–14	3–4
13	e — Toronto Tempo	11	33	.250	22	5–15	7–15	4–18	2–4
14	e — Connecticut Sun	11	33	.250	22	4–16	8–14	3–19	0–6
15	e — Seattle Storm	8	36	.182	25	1–22	6–16	2–20	0–7

Notes

(#) – League Standing
c – Commissioner's Cup winner
y – Regular season champion
x – Clinched playoff berth
e – Eliminated from playoff contention
Source: Overall standings and Commissioner's Cup Standings

== Playoffs ==
**First round** Best-of-3
1	Minnesota Lynx	0
8	**New York Liberty**	**2**
4	**Atlanta Dream**	**2**
5	Washington Mystics	0
2	**Golden State Valkyries**	**2**
7	Dallas Wings	1
3	**Las Vegas Aces**	**2**
6	Indiana Fever	1

**Semifinals**; Best-of-5
8	New York Liberty	0
4	**Atlanta Dream**	**3**
2	**Golden State Valkyries**	**3**
3	Las Vegas Aces	0

**Finals**; Best-of-7
4	Atlanta Dream	3
2	**Golden State Valkyries**	**4**

- **Bold** – Series winner
- Italic – Team with home-court-advantage
