= 2026 Las Vegas Aces season =

- Head coach: Becky Hammon
- Arena: Michelob Ultra Arena; T-Mobile Arena

Results
- Record: 31–13 (.705)
- Place: 3rd (Western)
- Playoff finish: 3rd seed Lost in Semifinals 0–3 to Golden State Valkyries

The 2026 Las Vegas Aces season was the franchise's 29th season in the Women's National Basketball Association and the ninth year the franchise is based in Las Vegas – after relocating from San Antonio and Utah. This is the fifth season under head coach Becky Hammon. The team advanced to the 2026 WNBA Commissioner's Cup championship game after leading the Western Conference with a 6–1 record and clinching the head-to-head tiebreaker over the Minnesota Lynx. However, they lost the game to the New York Liberty.

The Aces finished the regular season with a 31–13 record, qualifying for the 2026 NBA playoffs as the third seed. They beat the Indiana Fever in three games of the first round. However, they were swept by the eventual WNBA champions Golden State Valkyries in the semifinals.

== Draft ==
The draft was held on April 13, 2026, at 7:30 pm EDT, and broadcast on ESPN.

Round	Pick	Player	Position	Nationality	College/Club	Outcome	Ref.
2	29	Janiah Barker	F	United States	Tennessee	Signed four-year contract	
3	44	Jordan Obi	G	United States	Kentucky	Waived May 4	

== Transactions ==
=== Front office and coaching ===
Date	Details	Ref.

== Roster ==
Las Vegas Aces roster
Players
Coaches

Pos.	No.	Nat.	Name	Height	Weight	DOB	From	Yrs
F	2	(United States)	Barker, Janiah (injured)	6' 4" (1.93m)	185 lb (84kg)	2003-11-08	Tennessee	R
F	1	(United States)	Bell, Kierstan	6' 1" (1.85m)	176 lb (80kg)	2000-03-16	Florida Gulf Coast	4
C	20	(United States)	Brown, Kalani	6' 7" (2.01m)	245 lb (111kg)	1997-03-21	Baylor	6
G	11	(United States)	Evans, Dana	5' 6" (1.68m)	145 lb (66kg)	1998-08-01	Louisville	5
G	12	(United States)	Gray, Chelsea	5' 11" (1.8m)	170 lb (77kg)	1992-10-08	Duke	11
G	5	(United States)	Latson, Ta'Niya	5' 9" (1.75m)		2003-12-26	South Carolina	R
G	24	(United States)	Loyd, Jewell	5' 11" (1.8m)	175 lb (79kg)	1993-10-05	Notre Dame	11
F	32	(United States)	Parker-Tyus, Cheyenne	6' 4" (1.93m)	193 lb (88kg)	1992-08-22	Middle Tennessee	11
G/F	13	(United States)	Pissott, Justine	6' 4" (1.93m)	175 lb (79kg)	2004-02-04	Vanderbilt	R
F	3	(United States)	Smith, NaLyssa (injured)	6' 4" (1.93m)	185 lb (84kg)	2000-08-08	Baylor	4
F	7	(Australia)	Talbot, Stephanie	6' 2" (1.88m)	192 lb (87kg)	1994-06-15	Australia	7
F/C	21	(United States)	Turner, Brianna	6' 3" (1.91m)	175 lb (79kg)	1996-07-05	Notre Dame	7
C	22	(United States)	Wilson, A'ja	6' 4" (1.93m)	195 lb (88kg)	1996-08-08	South Carolina	8
G	18	(Japan)	Yamamoto, Mai	5' 5" (1.65m)	128 lb (58kg)	1999-10-23	Oka Gakuen (Nagoya, Japan)	R
G	0	(United States)	Young, Jackie	6' 0" (1.83m)	165 lb (75kg)	1997-09-16	Notre Dame	7

Head coach
(United States) Becky Hammon (Colorado State)
Assistant coaches
(United States) Tyrone Ellis (Southern Nazarene)
(United States) Nola Henry (College of Charleston)
(United States) Larry Lewis (Morehouse)
(United States) Charlene Thomas-Swinson (Auburn)
Athletic trainer
(United States) Bryson Creer (BYU)

Legend

- (C) Team captain
- (DP) Unsigned draft pick
- (FA) Free agent
- (S) Suspended
- Injured

WNBA roster page

East
ATL
CHI
CON
IND
NY
TOR
WAS
West
DAL
GS
LV
LA
MIN
PHO
POR
SEA

=== Depth chart ===
Pos.	Starter	Bench
PG	Chelsea Gray
SG	Jackie Young	Jewell Loyd; Dana Evans
SF	Stephanie Talbot	Kierstan Bell
PF	NaLyssa Smith	Cheyenne Parker-Tyus; Janiah Barker
C	A'ja Wilson	Brianna Turner

== Schedule ==
=== Preseason ===
2026 pre-season game log
Total: 1–1 (Home: 1–0; Road: 0–1)
April / May: 1–1 (Home: 1–0; Road: 0–1)

Game	Date	Team	Score	High points	High rebounds	High assists	Location Attendance	Record
1	April 26	Japan	W 94–78	Chennedy Carter (18)	NaLyssa Smith (13)	Gray, Young (4)	Michelob Ultra Arena; 10,341	1–0
2	May 3	@ Dallas	L 84–101	A'ja Wilson (18)	Jewell Loyd (6)	Chelsea Gray (5)	Moody Center; 10.179	1–1

2026 pre-season schedule

=== Regular season ===
2026 game log
Total: 31–13 (Home: 15–7; Road: 16–6)
May: 5–3 (Home: 0–2; Road: 5–1)

Game	Date	Team	Score	High points	High rebounds	High assists	Location Attendance	Record
1	May 9	Phoenix	L 66–99	A'ja Wilson (19)	Bell, Smith, Young (6)	Chelsea Gray (6)	T-Mobile Arena	0–1
2	May 10	@ Los Angeles	W 105–78	Jackie Young (20)	Smith, Turner (6)	Jackie Young (9)	Crypto.com Arena	1–1
3	May 13	@ Connecticut	W 98–69	Chennedy Carter (27)	A'ja Wilson (11)	Gray, Young (6)	Mohegan Sun Arena	2–1
4	May 15	@ Connecticut	W 101–94	A'ja Wilson (45)	Chelsea Gray (7)	Chelsea Gray (10)	Mohegan Sun Arena	3–1
5	May 17	@ Atlanta	W 85–84	Chelsea Gray (21)	Jackie Young (7)	Jackie Young (7)	Gateway Center Arena	4–1
6	May 23	Los Angeles	L 95–101	A'ja Wilson (24)	A'ja Wilson (15)	Chelsea Gray (7)	Michelob Ultra Arena	4–2
7	May 28	@ Dallas	L 87–95	A'ja Wilson (21)	NaLyssa Smith (12)	Chelsea Gray (8)	College Park Center; 6,251	4–3
8	May 31	@ Golden State	W 91–81	A'ja Wilson (28)	A'ja Wilson (15)	Jackie Young (9)	Chase Center; 18,064	5–3

June : 9–2 (Home: 5–1; Road: 4–1)

Game	Date	Team	Score	High points	High rebounds	High assists	Location Attendance	Record
9	June 2	@ Los Angeles	W 79–69	A'ja Wilson (25)	A'ja Wilson (15)	Chelsea Gray (11)	Crypto.com Arena; 11,178	6–3
10	June 6	Golden State	W 84–79	A'ja Wilson (28)	A'ja Wilson (14)	Chelsea Gray (6)	Michelob Ultra Arena; 10,467	7–3
11	June 8	Seattle	W 101–91	A'ja Wilson (34)	A'ja Wilson (12)	A'ja Wilson (9)	Michelob Ultra Arena; 10,261	8–3
12	June 11	@ Portland	W 105–89	A'ja Wilson (32)	Smith, Talbot (10)	Jackie Young (10)	Moda Center; 13,178	9–3
13	June 13	Minnesota	W 100–97	A'ja Wilson (24)	A'ja Wilson (10)	Jackie Young (10)	Michelob Ultra Arena; 10,330	10–3
14	June 15	@ Dallas	L 66–96	Jewell Loyd (21)	NaLyssa Smith (6)	Chelsea Gray (9)	College Park Center; 6,251	10–4
15	June 17	@ Phoenix	W 86–76	A'ja Wilson (33)	A'ja Wilson (10)	Gray, Young (9)	Mortgage Matchup Center; 9,234	11–4
16	June 21	Golden State	W 92–73	Jackie Young (21)	A'ja Wilson (9)	Chelsea Gray (9)	Michelob Ultra Arena; 10,350	12–4
17	June 23	New York	L 76–87	Jackie Young (19)	A'ja Wilson (9)	Chelsea Gray (8)	Michelob Ultra Arena; 10,274	12–5
18	June 25	Dallas	W 99–84	A'ja Wilson (32)	NaLyssa Smith (11)	Chelsea Gray (9)	Michelob Ultra Arena; 10,295	13–5
19	June 28	@ Chicago	W 107–99	A'ja Wilson (30)	A'ja Wilson (15)	Gray, Young (8)	United Center; 11,476	14–5

July : 6–3 (Home: 4–2; Road: 2–1)

Game	Date	Team	Score	High points	High rebounds	High assists	Location Attendance	Record
20	July 3	Chicago	W 98–90 (OT)	NaLyssa Smith (29)	NaLyssa Smith (8)	Chelsea Gray (6)	T-Mobile Arena; 15,837	15–5
21	July 5	Indiana	L 68–84	Jackie Young (15)	NaLyssa Smith (10)	Chelsea Gray (6)	T-Mobile Arena; 17,796	15–6
22	July 9	@ Portland	W 88–80	A'ja Wilson (32)	A'ja Wilson (10)	Jackie Young (11)	Moda Center; 13,470	16–6
23	July 11	Phoenix	W 106–58	A'ja Wilson (21)	A'ja Wilson (15)	Chelsea Gray (12)	Michelob Ultra Arena; 10,321	17–6
24	July 12	Indiana	L 75–109	A'ja Wilson (20)	A'ja Wilson (12)	Chelsea Gray (6)	Michelob Ultra Arena; 10,513	17–7
25	July 20	@ Toronto	W 109–83	A'ja Wilson (26)	Parker-Tyus, Wilson (6)	Jackie Young (12)	Coca-Cola Coliseum; 8,210	18–7
26	July 22	@ Washington	L 99–100	A'ja Wilson (38)	Wilson, Young (7)	Jackie Young (7)	CareFirst Arena; 4,200	18–8
All-Star Game
27	July 28	Portland	W 98–83	A'ja Wilson (28)	A'ja Wilson (14)	Chelsea Gray (7)	Michelob Ultra Arena; 10,240	19–8
28	July 30	New York	W 104–99	A'ja Wilson (33)	A'ja Wilson (10)	Jackie Young (9)	Michelob Ultra Arena; 10,500	20–8

August : 7–5 (Home: 4–2; Road: 3–3)

Game	Date	Team	Score	High points	High rebounds	High assists	Location Attendance	Record
29	August 1	@ Chicago	L 83–84	A'ja Wilson (36)	A'ja Wilson (12)	Chelsea Gray (9)	Wintrust Arena; 9,025	20–9
30	August 3	@ Atlanta	W 109–87	Jackie Young (28)	Jackie Young (11)	Jackie Young (10)	Gateway Center Arena; 17,044	21–9
31	August 6	@ Indiana	W 86–84 (OT)	A'ja Wilson (26)	A'ja Wilson (13)	Jackie Young (9)	Gainbridge Fieldhouse; 17,274	22–9
32	August 8	@ Minnesota	L 87–98	Jackie Young (23)	NaLyssa Smith (11)	Chelsea Gray (6)	Target Center; 14,101	22–10
33	August 9	@ New York	L 71–111	Ta'Niya Latson (20)	NaLyssa Smith (6)	Mai Yamamoto (6)	Barclays Center; 17,082	22–11
34	August 11	Washington	W 86–76	A'ja Wilson (26)	A'ja Wilson (13)	Jackie Young (8)	Michelob Ultra Arena; 10,224	23–11
35	August 13	Washington	W 83–76	Jackie Young (32)	NaLyssa Smith (8)	Gray, Young (5)	Michelob Ultra Arena; 10,215	24–11
36	August 15	Minnesota	L 87–92	A'ja Wilson (32)	NaLyssa Smith (12)	Gray, Young (9)	Michelob Ultra Arena; 10,415	24–12
37	August 18	Atlanta	L 82–97	A'ja Wilson (27)	A'ja Wilson (14)	Jackie Young (5)	Michelob Ultra Arena; 10,219	24–13
38	August 20	Connecticut	W 101–78	Jackie Young (24)	Cheyenne Parker-Tyus (9)	Jackie Young (5)	Michelob Ultra Arena; 10,207	25–13
39	August 23	@ Toronto	W 88–78	A'ja Wilson (27)	NaLyssa Smith (8)	Gray, Wilson (7)	Rogers Arena; 15,877	26–13
40	August 28	Toronto	W 93–73	A'ja Wilson (27)	A'ja Wilson (8)	Jackie Young (8)	Michelob Ultra Arena; 10,523	27–13

September : 4–0 (Home: 2–0; Road: 2–0)

Game	Date	Team	Score	High points	High rebounds	High assists	Location Attendance	Record
41	September 17	@ Seattle	W 114–77	Jackie Young (35)	Chelsea Gray (9)	Chelsea Gray (6)	Climate Pledge Arena; 14,200	28–13
42	September 20	Seattle	W 98–77	A'ja Wilson (30)	A'ja Wilson (8)	Jackie Young (8)	Michelob Ultra Arena; 10,263	29–13
43	September 22	Los Angeles	W 89–79	A'ja Wilson (18)	A'ja Wilson (10)	Jackie Young (11)	Michelob Ultra Arena; 10,377	30–13
44	September 24	@ Phoenix	W 100–82	A'ja Wilson (34)	A'ja Wilson (10)	Jackie Young (11)	Mortgage Matchup Center; 12,385	31–13

2026 season schedule

Notes:

- Games highlighted in represent Commissioner's Cup games.

=== Playoffs ===
2026 playoff game log
First Round vs. Indiana Fever
Won Series 2–1

Game	Date	Team	Score	High points	High rebounds	High assists	Location Attendance	Series
1	September 27	Indiana	W 102–85	A'ja Wilson (38)	A'ja Wilson (16)	Jackie Young (10)	Michelob Ultra Arena; 10,207	1–0
2	September 29	@ Indiana	L 89–99	Jackie Young (31)	A'ja Wilson (9)	Chelsea Gray (7)	Gainbridge Fieldhouse; 16,298	1–1
3	October 1	Indiana	W 94–83	A'ja Wilson (36)	A'ja Wilson (10)	Jackie Young (7)	Michelob Ultra Arena; 10,388	2–1

Semifinals vs. Golden State Valkyries
Lost Series 0–3

Game	Date	Team	Score	High points	High rebounds	High assists	Location Attendance	Series
1	October 4	@ Golden State	L 60–71	A'ja Wilson (24)	Brianna Turner (7)	Jackie Young (5)	Chase Center; 18,064	0–1
2	October 7	@ Golden State	L 81–83	A'ja Wilson (24)	Kalani Brown (8)	Jackie Young (8)	Chase Center; 18,064	0–2
3	October 9	Golden State	L 77–87 (OT)	A'ja Wilson (21)	A'ja Wilson (10)	Chelsea Gray (5)	Michelob Ultra Arena; 10,218	0–3

2026 playoff schedule

== Standings ==
#	Team	W	L	PCT	GB	Conf.	Home	Road	Cup
1	y — Minnesota Lynx	33	11	.750	–	20–3	15–7	18–4	6–1
2	x — Golden State Valkyries	32	12	.727	1	15–8	17–5	15–7	5–2
3	x — Las Vegas Aces	31	13	.705	2	17–6	15–7	16–6	6–1
4	x — Atlanta Dream	30	14	.682	3	15–5	15–7	15–7	4–2
5	x — Washington Mystics	28	16	.636	5	15–5	15–7	13–9	3–3
6	x — Indiana Fever	28	16	.636	5	14–6	15–7	13–9	5–1
7	x — Dallas Wings	27	17	.614	6	13–10	16–6	11–11	4–3
8	cx – New York Liberty	26	18	.591	7	13–7	14–8	12–10	6–0
9	e — Portland Fire	17	27	.386	16	7–16	9–13	8–14	2–5
10	e — Phoenix Mercury	16	28	.364	17	10–13	7–15	9–13	2–5
11	e — Chicago Sky	16	28	.364	17	4–16	11–11	5–17	1–5
12	e — Los Angeles Sparks	16	28	.364	17	9–14	8–14	8–14	3–4
13	e — Toronto Tempo	11	33	.250	22	5–15	7–15	4–18	2–4
14	e — Connecticut Sun	11	33	.250	22	4–16	8–14	3–19	0–6
15	e — Seattle Storm	8	36	.182	25	1–22	6–16	2–20	0–7

Notes

(#) – League Standing
c – Commissioner's Cup winner
y – Regular season champion
x – Clinched playoff berth
e – Eliminated from playoff contention
Source: Overall standings and Commissioner's Cup Standings

== Playoffs ==
**First round** Best-of-3
1	Minnesota Lynx	0
8	**New York Liberty**	**2**
4	**Atlanta Dream**	**2**
5	Washington Mystics	0
2	**Golden State Valkyries**	**2**
7	Dallas Wings	1
3	**Las Vegas Aces**	**2**
6	Indiana Fever	1

**Semifinals**; Best-of-5
8	New York Liberty	0
4	**Atlanta Dream**	**3**
2	**Golden State Valkyries**	**3**
3	Las Vegas Aces	0

**Finals**; Best-of-7
4	Atlanta Dream	3
2	**Golden State Valkyries**	**4**

- **Bold** – Series winner
- Italic – Team with home-court-advantage
