= 2026 Atlanta Dream season =

- Head coach: Karl Smesko
- Arena: Gateway Center Arena (regular season); State Farm Arena (playoffs)

Results
- Record: 30–14 (.682)
- Place: 1st (Eastern)
- Playoff finish: 4th seed Lost in WNBA Finals 3–4 vs. Golden State Valkyries

The 2026 Atlanta Dream season was the 19th season for the Atlanta Dream of the Women's National Basketball Association and their second under head coach Karl Smesko.

The Dream reached the 2026 WNBA Finals, losing 3–4 to the Golden State Valkyries.

== Draft ==
The draft was held on April 13, 2026, at 7:30 pm EDT, and broadcast on ESPN.

Round	Pick	Player	Position	Nationality	College/Club	Outcome	Ref.
1	13	Madina Okot	C	Kenya	South Carolina Gamecocks	Signed four-year rookie contract	
2	28	Indya Nivar	G	USA	North Carolina Tar Heels	Signed four-year rookie contract, waived July 7, signed player development contract July 8	
3	43	Ran Kejia	G	China	Sichuan Yuanda (China)	Did not join team, chose to play at Xavier for the NCAA 2026-2027 season	

== Transactions ==
=== Front office and coaching ===
Date	Details	Ref.

=== Trades ===
April
April 6	To Atlanta Dream Angel Reese; 2028 second-round pick swap	To Chicago Sky 2027 first-round pick 2028 first-round pick

== Roster ==
Atlanta Dream roster
Players
Coaches

Pos.	No.	Nat.	Name	Height	Weight	DOB	From	Yrs
G/F	24	(North Macedonia)	Bonner, DeWanna	6' 4" (1.93m)	140 lb (64kg)	1987-08-21	Auburn	16
G	20	(Australia)	Borlase, Isobel	5' 11" (1.8m)		2004-09-12	Lake Ginninderra	R
G	3	(United States)	Canada, Jordin	5' 6" (1.68m)	135 lb (61kg)	1995-08-11	UCLA	8
G	15	(United States)	Gray, Allisha	6' 0" (1.83m)	167 lb (76kg)	1995-01-12	South Carolina	9
F	00	(United States)	Hillmon, Naz	6' 2" (1.88m)	190 lb (86kg)	2000-04-05	Michigan	4
F	10	(United States)	Howard, Rhyne	6' 2" (1.88m)	175 lb (79kg)	2000-04-29	Kentucky	4
C	42	(United States)	Jones, Brionna (injured)	6' 3" (1.91m)	215 lb (98kg)	1995-12-18	Maryland	9
F	23	(Mali)	Koné, Sika	6' 3" (1.91m)	180 lb (82kg)	2002-07-13	Mali	3
G	21	(United States)	Nivar, Indya	5' 10" (1.78m)		2004-01-16	North Carolina	R
C	11	(Kenya)	Okot, Madina	6' 6" (1.98m)		2004-08-23	South Carolina	R
G	2	(United States)	Paopao, Te-Hina	5' 9" (1.75m)		2002-08-21	South Carolina	1
F	5	(United States)	Reese, Angel	6' 4" (1.93m)	165 lb (75kg)	2002-05-06	LSU	2
G	0	(Italy)	Villa, Matilde	5' 7" (1.7m)	140 lb (64kg)	2004-12-09	Italy	R
G	33	(United States)	Walker-Kimbrough, Shatori	5' 9" (1.75m)	140 lb (64kg)	1995-05-18	Maryland	9

Head coach
(United States) Karl Smesko (Kent State)
Assistant coaches
(United States) Camryn Brown (High Point)
(United States) Chelsea Lyles (Florida Gulf Coast)
(United States) Brandi Poole (Sewanee)
(United States) LaToya Sanders (North Carolina)
Athletic trainer
(United States) Katie Buria (Arkansas)

Legend

- (C) Team captain
- (DP) Unsigned draft pick
- (FA) Free agent
- (S) Suspended
- Injured

WNBA roster page

East
ATL
CHI
CON
IND
NY
TOR
WAS
West
DAL
GS
LV
LA
MIN
PHO
POR
SEA

=== Depth chart ===
Pos.	Starter	Bench
PG	Jordin Canada	Te-Hina Paopao
SG	Allisha Gray	Isobel Borlase
SF	Rhyne Howard	DeWanna Bonner
PF	Naz Hillmon	Sika Koné
C	Angel Reese	Madina Okot

== Schedule ==
=== Preseason ===
2026 pre-season game log
Total: 1–1 (Home: 0–1; Road: 1–0)
April / May: 1–1 (Home: 0–1; Road: 1–0)

Game	Date	Team	Score	High points	High rebounds	High assists	Location Attendance	Record
1	April 29	@ Chicago	W 87–78	Madina Okot (14)	Madina Okot (11)	Canada, Paopao (4)	Wintrust Arena; 6,139	1–0
2	May 3	Washington	L 72–83	Holly Winterburn (12)	S. Jones, Okot (6)	Maite Cazorla (4)	Gateway Center Arena; 3,229	1–1

2026 pre-season schedule

=== Regular season ===
2026 game log
Total: 30–14 (Home: 15–7; Road: 15–7)
May: 5–2 (Home: 2–1; Road: 3–1)

Game	Date	Team	Score	High points	High rebounds	High assists	Location Attendance	Record
1	May 10	@ Minnesota	W 91–90	Allisha Gray (24)	Angel Reese (14)	Jordin Canada (6)	Target Center; 10,821	1–0
2	May 12	@ Dallas	W 77–72	Allisha Gray (26)	Angel Reese (16)	Jordin Canada (5)	College Park Center; 6,251	2–0
3	May 17	Las Vegas	L 84–85	Allisha Gray (25)	Madina Okot (11)	Jordin Canada (5)	State Farm Arena; 17,044	2–1
4	May 22	Dallas	W 86–69	Rhyne Howard (25)	Angel Reese (9)	Rhyne Howard (8)	Gateway Center Arena; 3,626	3–1
5	May 24	Phoenix	W 82–80	Rhyne Howard (21)	Angel Reese (10)	Jordin Canada (14)	Gateway Center Arena; 3,575	4–1
6	May 27	@ Minnesota	L 81–96	Allisha Gray (21)	Hillmon, Reese (8)	Canada, Reese (5)	Target Center; 9,921	4–2
7	May 29	@ Portland	W 86–66	Angel Reese (18)	Angel Reese (12)	Angel Reese (5)	Moda Center; 13,602	5–2

June : 7–5 (Home: 4–1; Road: 3–4)

Game	Date	Team	Score	High points	High rebounds	High assists	Location Attendance	Record
8	June 2	Connecticut	W 91–75	Rhyne Howard (36)	Angel Reese (13)	Jordin Canada (10)	Gateway Center Arena; 3,575	6–2
9	June 4	@ Indiana	L 71–83	Canada, Gray (13)	Angel Reese (10)	Jordin Canada (7)	Gainbridge Fieldhouse; 17,002	6–3
10	June 6	Washington	W 109–77	Rhyne Howard (19)	Angel Reese (17)	Canada, Gray (5)	Gateway Center Arena; 3,609	7–3
11	June 9	@ Chicago	W 82–75	Howard, Reese (17)	Angel Reese (17)	Jordin Canada (6)	Wintrust Arena; 6,921	8–3
12	June 11	New York	L 90–104	Angel Reese (25)	Angel Reese (9)	Jordin Canada (7)	Gateway Center Arena; 3,600	8–4
13	June 14	@ Toronto	W 102–77	Allisha Gray (26)	Angel Reese (17)	Jordin Canada (9)	Coca-Cola Coliseum; 8,210	9–4
14	June 18	@ Indiana	W 108–101	Angel Reese (21)	Angel Reese (11)	Rhyne Howard (6)	Gainbridge Fieldhouse; 17,274	10–4
15	June 20	Indiana	W 113–96	Rhyne Howard (24)	Angel Reese (8)	Jordin Canada (12)	State Farm Arena; 17,044	11–4
16	June 22	Toronto	W 94–87	Rhyne Howard (20)	Angel Reese (9)	Jordin Canada (13)	State Farm Arena; 9,685	12–4
17	June 24	@ Golden State	L 66–77	Madina Okot (16)	Angel Reese (12)	Angel Reese (4)	Chase Center; 18,064	12–5
18	June 26	@ Golden State	L 75–78	Jordin Canada (23)	Angel Reese (12)	Borlase, Canada, Gray, Howard (2)	Chase Center; 18,064	12–6
19	June 27	@ Seattle	L 90–105	Rhyne Howard (27)	Angel Reese (9)	Jordin Canada (10)	Climate Pledge Arena; 13,643	12–7

July : 6–3 (Home: 4–2; Road: 2–1)

Game	Date	Team	Score	High points	High rebounds	High assists	Location Attendance	Record
20	July 2	@ Washington	L 76–81	Rhyne Howard (24)	Angel Reese (13)	Jordin Canada (7)	CareFirst Arena; 4,200	12–8
21	July 4	Golden State	L 83–88	Allisha Gray (22)	Angel Reese (13)	Jordin Canada (8)	Gateway Center Arena; 3,596	12–9
22	July 9	Seattle	W 89–78	Allisha Gray (22)	Angel Reese (11)	Jordin Canada (8)	Gateway Center Arena; 3,617	13–9
23	July 11	Portland	L 92–102	Allisha Gray (20)	Hillmon, Okot (8)	Jordin Canada (12)	Gateway Center Arena; 3,577	13–10
24	July 13	Los Angeles	W 101–92	Angel Reese (23)	Angel Reese (13)	Jordin Canada (9)	Gateway Center Arena; 3,592	14–10
25	July 17	@ Toronto	W 111–92	Naz Hillmon (24)	Angel Reese (12)	Jordin Canada (13)	Coca-Cola Coliseum; 8,210	15–10
26	July 19	Chicago	W 93–91	Allisha Gray (29)	Brionna Jones (10)	Jordin Canada (9)	Gateway Center Arena; 3,575	16–10
All-Star Game
27	July 29	@ Dallas	W 82–81	Allisha Gray (25)	Angel Reese (12)	Jordin Canada (8)	College Park Center; 6,251	17–10
28	July 31	Seattle	W 98–89	Angel Reese (21)	Angel Reese (13)	Jordin Canada (9)	Gateway Center Arena; 3,610	18–10

August : 8–4 (Home: 3–3; Road: 5–1)

Game	Date	Team	Score	High points	High rebounds	High assists	Location Attendance	Record
29	August 3	Las Vegas	L 87–109	Angel Reese (23)	Angel Reese (16)	Jordin Canada (7)	State Farm Arena; 17,044	18–11
30	August 5	Phoenix	W 96–82	Rhyne Howard (23)	Angel Reese (10)	Rhyne Howard (8)	Gateway Center Arena; 3,575	19–11
31	August 7	@ Washington	L 74–79	Allisha Gray (26)	Angel Reese (16)	Jordin Canada (7)	CareFirst Arena; 4,200	19–12
32	August 10	Toronto	W 107–95	Rhyne Howard (22)	Angel Reese (14)	Jordin Canada (9)	Gateway Center Arena; 3,575	20–12
33	August 13	@ Connecticut	W 104–69	Gray, Howard (29)	Angel Reese (15)	Canada, Howard (4)	Mohegan Sun Arena; 8,911	21–12
34	August 16	Indiana	L 91–95 (OT)	Allisha Gray (32)	Angel Reese (14)	Angel Reese (6)	State Farm Arena; 17,044	21–13
35	August 18	@ Las Vegas	W 97–82	Rhyne Howard (23)	Angel Reese (10)	Jordin Canada (5)	Michelob Ultra Arena; 10,219	22–13
36	August 20	@ Los Angeles	W 124–88	Rhyne Howard (26)	Angel Reese (10)	Jordin Canada (11)	Crypto.com Arena; 12,223	23–13
37	August 22	@ Phoenix	W 99–89	Angel Reese (31)	Angel Reese (14)	Isobel Borlase (6)	Mortgage Matchup Center; 12,431	24–13
38	August 24	@ Los Angeles	W 78–71	Allisha Gray (20)	Angel Reese (26)	Allisha Gray (6)	Crypto.com Arena; 10,442	25–13
39	August 28	Portland	L 83–101	Rhyne Howard (26)	Angel Reese (16)	Canada, Reese (6)	Gateway Center Arena; 3,575	25–14
40	August 30	Minnesota	W 89–81	Allisha Gray (23)	Gray, Reese (11)	Jordin Canada (10)	Gateway Center Arena; 3,614	26–14

September : 4–0 (Home: 2–0; Road: 2–0)

Game	Date	Team	Score	High points	High rebounds	High assists	Location Attendance	Record
41	September 17	Connecticut	W 103–59	Angel Reese (30)	Angel Reese (10)	Rhyne Howard (8)	Gateway Center Arena; 3,575	27–14
42	September 19	Chicago	W 106–81	Angel Reese (23)	Angel Reese (10)	Jordin Canada (9)	State Farm Arena; 17,099	28–14
43	September 21	@ New York	W 95–84	Jordin Canada (19)	Angel Reese (10)	Jordin Canada (9)	Barclays Center; 16,458	29–14
44	September 23	@ New York	W 83–65	Allisha Gray (24)	DeWanna Bonner (8)	Rhyne Howard (6)	Barclays Center; 17,581	30–14

2026 season schedule

Notes:

- Games highlighted in represent Commissioner's Cup games.

=== Playoffs ===
2026 playoff game log
First round vs. Washington Mystics
Won series: 2–0

Game	Date	Team	Score	High points	High rebounds	High assists	Location Attendance	Series
1	September 27	Washington	W 92–77	Rhyne Howard (26)	Angel Reese (12)	Jordin Canada (10)	State Farm Arena; 9,766	1–0
2	September 30	@ Washington	W 93–75	Allisha Gray (22)	Canada, Reese (7)	Jordin Canada (11)	CareFirst Arena; 4,200	2–0

Semifinals vs. New York Liberty
Won series: 3–0

Game	Date	Team	Score	High points	High rebounds	High assists	Location Attendance	Series
1	October 4	New York	W 92–82	Jordin Canada (25)	DeWanna Bonner (9)	Rhyne Howard (8)	State Farm Arena; 9,745	1–0
2	October 7	New York	W 101–98 (OT)	Canada, Reese (23)	Naz Hillmon (8)	Jordin Canada (8)	State Farm Arena; 9,574	2–0
3	October 9	@ New York	W 85–83	Angel Reese (22)	DeWanna Bonner (13)	Jordin Canada (11)	Barclays Center; 17,991	3–0

Finals vs. Golden State Valkyries
Lost Series: 3–4

Game	Date	Team	Score	High points	High rebounds	High assists	Location Attendance	Series
1	October 17	@ Golden State	L 64–68	Allisha Gray (19)	Angel Reese (12)	Jordin Canada (7)	Chase Center; 18,064	0–1
2	October 19	@ Golden State	W 79–65	Angel Reese (30)	Angel Reese (16)	Jordin Canada (10)	Chase Center; 18,064	1–1
3	October 21	Golden State	W 97–71	Angel Reese (21)	Angel Reese (12)	Jordin Canada (8)	State Farm Arena; 17,099	2–1
4	October 24	Golden State	L 62–67	Rhyne Howard (19)	Hillmon, Reese (9)	Jordin Canada (4)	State Farm Arena; 17,099	2–2
5	October 26	@ Golden State	L 55–64	Rhyne Howard (20)	Angel Reese (15)	Canada, Reese (5)	Chase Center; 18,064	2–3
6	October 29	Golden State	W 80–69	Allisha Gray (23)	Angel Reese (14)	Angel Reese (6)	State Farm Arena; 17,099	3–3
7	October 31	@ Golden State	L 63–68	Jordin Canada (18)	Angel Reese (12)	Jordin Canada (5)	Chase Center; 18,064	3–4

2026 season schedule

== Standings ==
#	Team	W	L	PCT	GB	Conf.	Home	Road	Cup
1	y — Minnesota Lynx	33	11	.750	–	20–3	15–7	18–4	6–1
2	x — Golden State Valkyries	32	12	.727	1	15–8	17–5	15–7	5–2
3	x — Las Vegas Aces	31	13	.705	2	17–6	15–7	16–6	6–1
4	x — Atlanta Dream	30	14	.682	3	15–5	15–7	15–7	4–2
5	x — Washington Mystics	28	16	.636	5	15–5	15–7	13–9	3–3
6	x — Indiana Fever	28	16	.636	5	14–6	15–7	13–9	5–1
7	x — Dallas Wings	27	17	.614	6	13–10	16–6	11–11	4–3
8	cx – New York Liberty	26	18	.591	7	13–7	14–8	12–10	6–0
9	e — Portland Fire	17	27	.386	16	7–16	9–13	8–14	2–5
10	e — Phoenix Mercury	16	28	.364	17	10–13	7–15	9–13	2–5
11	e — Chicago Sky	16	28	.364	17	4–16	11–11	5–17	1–5
12	e — Los Angeles Sparks	16	28	.364	17	9–14	8–14	8–14	3–4
13	e — Toronto Tempo	11	33	.250	22	5–15	7–15	4–18	2–4
14	e — Connecticut Sun	11	33	.250	22	4–16	8–14	3–19	0–6
15	e — Seattle Storm	8	36	.182	25	1–22	6–16	2–20	0–7

Notes

(#) – League Standing
c – Commissioner's Cup winner
y – Regular season champion
x – Clinched playoff berth
e – Eliminated from playoff contention
Source: Overall standings and Commissioner's Cup Standings

== Playoffs ==
**First round** Best-of-3
1	Minnesota Lynx	0
8	**New York Liberty**	**2**
4	**Atlanta Dream**	**2**
5	Washington Mystics	0
2	**Golden State Valkyries**	**2**
7	Dallas Wings	1
3	**Las Vegas Aces**	**2**
6	Indiana Fever	1

**Semifinals**; Best-of-5
8	New York Liberty	0
4	**Atlanta Dream**	**3**
2	**Golden State Valkyries**	**3**
3	Las Vegas Aces	0

**Finals**; Best-of-7
4	Atlanta Dream	3
2	**Golden State Valkyries**	**4**

- **Bold** – Series winner
- Italic – Team with home-court-advantage
