= 2026 Los Angeles Sparks season =

- Head coach: Lynne Roberts
- Arena: Crypto.com Arena

Results
- Record: 16–28 (.364)
- Place: 6th (Western)
- Playoff finish: Did not qualify

Media
- Television: Spectrum SportsNet; ABC/ESPN/ESPN2; NBC; USA Network; Ion; CBS

The 2026 Los Angeles Sparks was the franchise's 30th season in the Women's National Basketball Association and the second under head coach Lynne Roberts.

== Draft ==
The draft was held on April 13, 2026, at 7:30 pm EDT, and broadcast on ESPN.

Round	Pick	Player	Position	Nationality	College/Club	Outcome	Ref.
2	20	Ta'Niya Latson	G	United States	South Carolina		
2	24	Chance Gray	G	United States	Ohio State		
3	35	Amelia Hassett	F	Australia	Kentucky		

== Transactions ==
=== Front office and coaching ===
Date	Details	Ref.

=== Free agency ===
==== Additions ====
Player	Date	Notes	Former Team	Ref.

=== Subtractions / unsigned ===
Player	Date	Reason	New Team	Ref.

== Roster ==
Los Angeles Sparks roster
Players
Coaches

Pos.	No.	Nat.	Name	Height	Weight	DOB	From	Yrs
G	1	(Cameroon)	Akoa Makani, Monique	5' 11" (1.8m)		2001-02-04	Cameroon	1
G	7	(United States)	Atkins, Ariel	5' 8" (1.73m)	167 lb (76kg)	1996-07-30	Texas	8
F	22	(United States)	Brink, Cameron	6' 4" (1.93m)	170 lb (77kg)	2001-12-31	Stanford	2
G/F	12	(United States)	Burrell, Rae	6' 2" (1.88m)	168 lb (76kg)	2000-06-21	Tennessee	3
F	32	(United States)	Cannon, Emma	6' 2" (1.88m)	190 lb (86kg)	1989-06-01	Florida Southern	6
G	2	(United States)	Gray, Chance	5' 9" (1.75m)		2004-07-06	Ohio State	R
F	5	(United States)	Hamby, Dearica	6' 3" (1.91m)	189 lb (86kg)	1993-11-06	Wake Forest	10
G	4	(United States)	Morgan, Tonie			2004-07-16	Kentucky	R
G	-	(United States)	Mwenentanda, Ndjakalenga	6' 2" (1.88m)		2003-11-24	Vanderbilt	R
G/F	-	(United States)	Nye, Aaliyah	6' 0" (1.83m)		2002-08-14	Alabama	1
F	30	(United States)	Ogwumike, Nneka	6' 2" (1.88m)	190 lb (86kg)	1990-07-02	Stanford	13
G	6	(South Korea)	Park, Ji-hyun	6' 1" (1.85m)		2000-04-07	Soongeui Girls' High School (Seoul, South Korea)	R
G	–	(United States)	Sellers, Shyanne	6' 2" (1.88m)		2003-04-24	Maryland	R
G	17	(United States)	Wheeler, Erica	5' 7" (1.7m)	143 lb (65kg)	1991-05-02	Rutgers	9

Assistant coaches
(United States) Zak Buncik (UT Arlington)
(United States) Ebony Hoffman (USC)
(United States) Zach O'Brien (St. Joseph's College of Maine)
Athletic trainer
(United States) Karissa Scherer
(United States) Tavon Spears

Legend

- (C) Team captain
- (DP) Unsigned draft pick
- (FA) Free agent
- (S) Suspended
- Injured

WNBA roster page

East
ATL
CHI
CON
IND
NY
TOR
WAS
West
DAL
GS
LV
LA
MIN
PHO
POR
SEA

=== Depth chart ===
Pos.	Starter	Bench
PG	Erica Wheeler	Chance Gray; Tonie Morgan
SG	Ariel Atkins	Monique Akoa Makani; Kiana Williams; Kate Martin
SF	Rae Burrell	Park Ji-hyun; Alissa Pili
PF	Nneka Ogwumike	Emma Cannon
C	Dearica Hamby	Cameron Brink

== Schedule ==
=== Preseason ===
2026 pre-season game log
Total: 2–0 (Home: 1–0; Road: 1–0)
April: 2–0 (Home: 1–0; Road: 1–0)

Game	Date	Team	Score	High points	High rebounds	High assists	Location Attendance	Record
1	April 25	Nigeria	W 89–63	Kelsey Plum (22)	Ariel Atkins (6)	Erica Wheeler (7)	Viejas Arena; 3,459	1–0
2	May 3	@ Portland	W 85–75	Nneka Ogwumike (17)	Brink, Hamby, Ogwumike (4)	Nneka Ogwumike (5)	Moda Center; 13,550	2–0

2026 pre-season schedule

=== Regular season ===
2026 game log
Total: 16–28 (Home: 8–14; Road: 8–14)
May: 4–4 (Home: 1–3; Road: 3–1)

Game	Date	Team	Score	High points	High rebounds	High assists	Location Attendance	Record
1	May 10	Las Vegas	L 78–105	Kelsey Plum (27)	Nneka Ogwumike (10)	Ariel Atkins (3)	Crypto.com Arena; 12,266	0–1
2	May 13	Indiana	L 78–87	Kelsey Plum (25)	Dearica Hamby (8)	Plum, Wheeler (4)	Crypto.com Arena; 12,605	0–2
3	May 15	Toronto	W 99–95	Kelsey Plum (27)	Dearica Hamby (7)	Kelsey Plum (9)	Crypto.com Arena; 11,861	1–2
4	May 17	Toronto	L 96–106	Kelsey Plum (28)	Dearica Hamby (9)	Plum, Wheeler (7)	Crypto.com Arena; 11,648	1–3
5	May 21	@ Phoenix	W 97–88	Dearica Hamby (27)	Dearica Hamby (15)	Kelsey Plum (7)	Mortgage Matchup Center; 10,953	2–3
6	May 23	@ Las Vegas	W 101–95	Kelsey Plum (38)	Cameron Brink (8)	Kelsey Plum (9)	Michelob Ultra Arena; 10,386	3–3
7	May 29	@ Washington	W 92–87	Erica Wheeler (21)	Nneka Ogwumike (11)	Dearica Hamby (9)	CareFirst Arena; 4,200	4–3
8	May 30	@ Connecticut	L 81–84	Atkins, Burrell (16)	Dearica Hamby (7)	Erica Wheeler (6)	PeoplesBank Arena; 10,478	4–4

June : 4–6 (Home: 2–3; Road: 2–3)

Game	Date	Team	Score	High points	High rebounds	High assists	Location Attendance	Record
9	June 2	Las Vegas	L 69–79	Rae Burrell (22)	Nneka Ogwumike (12)	Cameron Brink (3)	Crypto.com Arena; 11,178	4–5
10	June 5	Dallas	L 96–104	Kelsey Plum (27)	Nneka Ogwumike (10)	Plum, Wheeler (6)	Crypto.com Arena; 12,828	4–6
11	June 7	Portland	W 89–72	Dearica Hamby (22)	Nneka Ogwumike (17)	Kelsey Plum (7)	Crypto.com Arena; 11,227	5–6
12	June 10	@ Seattle	W 88–83	Nneka Ogwumike (24)	Dearica Hamby (10)	Kelsey Plum (11)	Climate Pledge Arena; 9,309	6–6
13	June 13	@ Phoenix	W 111–102 (OT)	Kelsey Plum (43)	Nneka Ogwumike (15)	Kelsey Plum (7)	Mortgage Matchup Center; 9,234	7–6
14	June 15	@ Golden State	L 58–78	Rae Burrell (13)	Dearica Hamby (10)	Erica Wheeler (5)	Chase Center; 18,064	7–7
15	June 17	Minnesota	L 83–99	Rae Burrell (19)	Dearica Hamby (9)	Erica Wheeler (4)	Crypto.com Arena; 11,481	7–8
16	June 21	New York	W 98–97	Nneka Ogwumike (24)	Dearica Hamby (8)	Kelsey Plum (7)	Crypto.com Arena; 18,043	8–8
17	June 25	@ Toronto	L 97–125	Hamby, Ogwumike (21)	Dearica Hamby (9)	Erica Wheeler (5)	Coca-Cola Coliseum; 8,210	8–9
18	June 27	@ Indiana	L 87–111	Nneka Ogwumike (17)	Nneka Ogwumike (7)	Erica Wheeler (5)	Gainbridge Fieldhouse; 16,018	8–10

July : 2–7 (Home: 2–3; Road: 0–4)

Game	Date	Team	Score	High points	High rebounds	High assists	Location Attendance	Record
19	July 6	Seattle	L 64–82	Dearica Hamby (17)	Nneka Ogwumike (11)	Erica Wheeler (7)	Crypto.com Arena; 12,160	8–11
20	July 8	Indiana	W 106–92	Nneka Ogwumike (24)	Dearica Hamby (9)	Erica Wheeler (6)	Crypto.com Arena; 12,939	9–11
21	July 10	Chicago	W 102–87	Nneka Ogwumike (25)	Nneka Ogwumike (12)	Erica Wheeler (8)	Crypto.com Arena; 11,827	10–11
22	July 13	@ Atlanta	L 92–101	Erica Wheeler (20)	Dearica Hamby (6)	Nneka Ogwumike (5)	Gateway Center Arena; 3,592	10–12
23	July 15	@ Minnesota	L 87–96	Rae Burrell (24)	Nneka Ogwumike (12)	Atkins, Wheeler (6)	Target Center; 16,410	10–13
24	July 17	@ Chicago	L 82–96	Hamby, Ogwumike (18)	Nneka Ogwumike (12)	Rae Burrell (5)	Wintrust Arena; 8,123	10–14
25	July 19	@ Dallas	L 82–90	Nneka Ogwumike (17)	Nneka Ogwumike (10)	Erica Wheeler (10)	College Park Center; 6,251	10–15
26	July 22	Phoenix	L 82–86	Rae Burrell (20)	Nneka Ogwumike (13)	Dearica Hamby (5)	Crypto.com Arena; 16,900	10–16
All-Star Game
27	July 28	New York	L 109–113	Rae Burrell (24)	Cameron Brink (6)	Ogwumike, Wheeler (9)	Crypto.com Arena; 15,499	10–17

August : 5–8 (Home: 2–4; Road: 3–4)

Game	Date	Team	Score	High points	High rebounds	High assists	Location Attendance	Record
28	August 2	@ Portland	W 106–101	Dearica Hamby (23)	Hamby, Ogwumike (10)	Erica Wheeler (8)	Moda Center; 13,638	11–17
29	August 5	@ Chicago	L 88–95	Dearica Hamby (22)	Dearica Hamby (14)	Burrell, Wheeler (5)	Wintrust Arena; 7,129	11–18
30	August 6	@ Minnesota	W 89–82	Rae Burrell (17)	Dearica Hamby (9)	Erica Wheeler (9)	Target Center; 12,824	12–18
31	August 9	Golden State	L 78–84	Nneka Ogwumike (16)	Brink, Ogwumike (7)	Atkins, Wheeler (4)	Crypto.com Arena; 15,739	12–19
32	August 11	Phoenix	L 87–94	Burrell, Hamby (19)	Nneka Ogwumike (9)	Nneka Ogwumike (8)	Crypto.com Arena; 6,247	12–20
33	August 13	@ New York	L 81–85	Rae Burrell (28)	Nneka Ogwumike (11)	Erica Wheeler (6)	Barclays Center; 16,071	12–21
34	August 15	@ Washington	L 70–80	Rae Burrell (20)	Hamby, Ogwumike (7)	Tonie Morgan (6)	CareFirst Arena; 4,200	12–22
35	August 18	@ Connecticut	L 77–85	Rae Burrell (19)	Nneka Ogwumike (7)	Rae Burrell (6)	TD Garden; 16,378	12–23
36	August 20	Atlanta	L 88–124	Cameron Brink (14)	Cameron Brink (7)	Nneka Ogwumike (5)	Crypto.com Arena; 12,223	12–24
37	August 22	Connecticut	W 77–68	Rae Burrell (20)	Nneka Ogwumike (11)	Erica Wheeler (5)	Crypto.com Arena; 10,878	13–24
38	August 24	Atlanta	L 71–78	Nneka Ogwumike (27)	Nneka Ogwumike (16)	Ariel Atkins (6)	Crypto.com Arena; 10,442	13–25
39	August 28	Washington	W 88–82	Nneka Ogwumike (24)	Cameron Brink (5)	Erica Wheeler (8)	Crypto.com Arena; 12,551	14–25
40	August 30	@ Seattle	W 90–74	Nneka Ogwumike (23)	Nneka Ogwumike (12)	Morgan, Wheeler (4)	Climate Pledge Arena; 14,200	15–25

September : 1–3 (Home: 1–1; Road: 0–2)

Game	Date	Team	Score	High points	High rebounds	High assists	Location Attendance	Record
41	September 17	@ Dallas	L 77–97	Nneka Ogwumike (18)	Nneka Ogwumike (7)	Burrell, Morgan, Ogwumike, Wheeler (4)	College Park Center; 6,251	15–26
42	September 20	Portland	W 105–84	Burrell, Ogwumike (20)	Nneka Ogwumike (12)	Nneka Ogwumike (5)	Crypto.com Arena; 17,703	16–26
43	September 22	@ Las Vegas	L 79–89	Nneka Ogwumike (17)	Nneka Ogwumike (9)	Erica Wheeler (5)	Michelob Ultra Arena; 10,377	16–27
44	September 24	Golden State	L 75–76	Nneka Ogwumike (17)	Nneka Ogwumike (15)	Ogwumike, Wheeler (5)	Chase Center; 15,965	16–28

2026 season schedule

Notes:

- Games highlighted in represent Commissioner's Cup games.

== Standings ==
#	Team	W	L	PCT	GB	Conf.	Home	Road	Cup
1	y — Minnesota Lynx	33	11	.750	–	20–3	15–7	18–4	6–1
2	x — Golden State Valkyries	32	12	.727	1	15–8	17–5	15–7	5–2
3	x — Las Vegas Aces	31	13	.705	2	17–6	15–7	16–6	6–1
4	x — Atlanta Dream	30	14	.682	3	15–5	15–7	15–7	4–2
5	x — Washington Mystics	28	16	.636	5	15–5	15–7	13–9	3–3
6	x — Indiana Fever	28	16	.636	5	14–6	15–7	13–9	5–1
7	x — Dallas Wings	27	17	.614	6	13–10	16–6	11–11	4–3
8	cx – New York Liberty	26	18	.591	7	13–7	14–8	12–10	6–0
9	e — Portland Fire	17	27	.386	16	7–16	9–13	8–14	2–5
10	e — Phoenix Mercury	16	28	.364	17	10–13	7–15	9–13	2–5
11	e — Chicago Sky	16	28	.364	17	4–16	11–11	5–17	1–5
12	e — Los Angeles Sparks	16	28	.364	17	9–14	8–14	8–14	3–4
13	e — Toronto Tempo	11	33	.250	22	5–15	7–15	4–18	2–4
14	e — Connecticut Sun	11	33	.250	22	4–16	8–14	3–19	0–6
15	e — Seattle Storm	8	36	.182	25	1–22	6–16	2–20	0–7

Notes

(#) – League Standing
c – Commissioner's Cup winner
y – Regular season champion
x – Clinched playoff berth
e – Eliminated from playoff contention
Source: Overall standings and Commissioner's Cup Standings
