= 2026 WNBA All-Star Game =

Exhibition basketball game

	1	2	3	4	Total
Team Spoon	35	46	24	24	129
Team Coop	34	30	29	29	122
- Date: July 25, 2026
- Arena: United Center
- City: Chicago, Illinois, United States
- MVP: Jonquel Jones
- Halftime show: Tyla
- Attendance: 19,783
- Network: ABC
- Announcers: Ryan Ruocco, Rebecca Lobo and Holly Rowe

WNBA All-Star Game
< 2025	2027 >

The 2026 WNBA All-Star Game was an exhibition basketball game that was played on July 25, 2026, at the United Center in Chicago, Illinois, United States. The Chicago Sky hosted the game and related events for the second time in franchise history. Unlike previous years, this year two WNBA legends, Cynthia Cooper and Teresa Weatherspoon, served as general managers in honor of the 30th WNBA Season and select players from the pool of all stars to each of the two teams.

== Roster selection ==
The voting was weighted as follows:

Voting group	Vote weight
**Fans**	50%
**Current WNBA players**	25%
**Sports media panel**	25%

=== Fan Vote results ===
The following are the top players based on total fan voting:

Rank	Player	Number of Votes
1	Paige Bueckers	1,045,051
2	Caitlin Clark	1,023,321
3	Aliyah Boston	1,001,399
4	A’ja Wilson	999,497
5	Breanna Stewart	874,798
6	Jessica Shepard	733,536
7	Gabby Williams	715,856
8	Angel Reese	681,500
9	Kelsey Mitchell	665,377
10	Azzi Fudd	631,746

=== Full voting results ===
Once voting has closed and votes tallied, players will be sorted into two categories (guards and frontcourt players) and ranked within the three voting groups listed above. The average of a player's weighted rank will determine their score. Then the four guards and six frontcourt players with the highest scores will be named the 2026 All-Star starters. Fan votes will serve as the tiebreaker, if needed.

**Bold**	Denotes player named as 2026 All-Star starter
°	Denotes player selected to All-Star reserve pool after head coach voting
*	Denotes player selected as injury replacement player

The following tables show the overall scores for the Top 10 guards and frontcourt players – based on the results from all three voting groups:

Guards
Rank	Player	Team	Fan Rank	Media Rank	Player Rank	Weighted Score
**1**	**Paige Bueckers**	**Dallas Wings**	**1**	2	1	1.25
**2**	**Olivia Miles**	**Minnesota Lynx**	5	**1**	3	3.5
**3**	**Caitlin Clark**	**Indiana Fever**	2	3	11	4.5
**4**	**Kelsey Mitchell**	**Indiana Fever**	3	7	7	5
5	Rhyne Howard °	Atlanta Dream	9	4	2	6
6	Allisha Gray °	Atlanta Dream	7	8	6	7
7	Kelsey Plum °	Los Angeles Sparks	6	5	12	7.25
8	Sonia Citron °	Washington Mystics	10	10	4	8.5
9	Marina Mabrey °	Toronto Tempo	12	6	4	8.5
10	Azzi Fudd	Dallas Wings	4	15	28	12.75
11	Jackie Young °	Las Vegas Aces	14	9	14	12.75

Frontcourt
Rank	Player	Team	Fan Rank	Media Rank	Player Rank	Weighted Score
**1**	**A'ja Wilson**	**Las Vegas Aces**	2	2	**1**	1.75
**2**	**Breanna Stewart**	**New York Liberty**	3	**1**	2	2.25
**3**	**Jessica Shepard**	**Dallas Wings**	4	3	3	3.5
**4**	**Aliyah Boston**	**Indiana Fever**	**1**	5	8	3.75
**5**	**Gabby Williams**	**Golden State Valkyries**	5	7	4	5.25
**6**	**Natasha Howard**	**Minnesota Lynx**	7	4	5	5.75
7	Angel Reese °	Atlanta Dream	6	6	6	6
8	Nneka Ogwumike °	Los Angeles Sparks	8	10	7	8.25
9	Kiki Iriafen °	Washington Mystics	9	12	11	10.25
10	Dominique Malonga °	Seattle Storm	10	12	10	10.5

=== Reserves selections ===
The twelve All-Star reserves were selected by the league's head coaches. Coaches voted for three guards, five frontcourt players and four players at either position regardless of conference.

Position	Player	Team
Guard	Sonia Citron	Washington Mystics
Guard	Allisha Gray	Atlanta Dream
Guard	Rhyne Howard	Atlanta Dream
Frontcourt	Kiki Iriafen	Washington Mystics
Frontcourt	Jonquel Jones	New York Liberty
Guard	Marina Mabrey	Toronto Tempo
Frontcourt	Dominique Malonga	Seattle Storm
Frontcourt	Nneka Ogwumike	Los Angeles Sparks
Guard	Kelsey Plum	Los Angeles Sparks
Frontcourt	Angel Reese	Atlanta Dream
Guard	Courtney Williams	Minnesota Lynx
Guard	Jackie Young	Las Vegas Aces

=== Final rosters ===
Unlike previous years, this year there will be no captains and instead two WNBA legends will serve as general managers and select players for the two teams.

**Team Spoon**
Pos	Player	Team	No. of selections
Starters
G	Caitlin Clark	Indiana Fever	3
G	Olivia Miles	Minnesota Lynx	1
F	Jessica Shepard	Dallas Wings	1
F	Aliyah Boston	Indiana Fever	4
F	A'ja Wilson	Las Vegas Aces	8
Reserves
G	Rhyne Howard	Atlanta Dream	4
G	Allisha Gray	Atlanta Dream	4
G	Courtney Williams	Minnesota Lynx	3
F	Nneka Ogwumike	Los Angeles Sparks	11
F	Jonquel Jones	New York Liberty	6
F	Kiki Iriafen	Washington Mystics	2
Head coach: Cheryl Reeve (Minnesota Lynx)

**Team Coop**
Pos	Player	Team	No. of selections
Starters
G	Paige Bueckers	Dallas Wings	2
G	Kelsey Mitchell	Indiana Fever	4
F	Gabby Williams	Golden State Valkyries	2
F	Natasha Howard	Minnesota Lynx	3
F	Breanna Stewart	New York Liberty	8
Reserves
G	Kelsey Plum ^{INJ1}	Los Angeles Sparks	5
G	Jackie Young	Las Vegas Aces	5
G	Sonia Citron	Washington Mystics	2
G	Marina Mabrey	Toronto Tempo	1
F	Angel Reese	Atlanta Dream	3
F	Dominique Malonga	Seattle Storm	1
G	Kahleah Copper ^{REP1}	Phoenix Mercury	5
Head coach: Becky Hammon (Las Vegas Aces)

Notes

- **^INJ1** Plum removed herself from All-Star Game reserve spot, due to injury
- **^REP1** Copper was selected as an All-Star replacement for Plum

== Head coach selection ==
The two coaches with the best team record following games on Friday, July 10, were named the 2026 All-Star coaches (regardless of conference).

On July 9, Cheryl Reeve of the Minnesota Lynx and Becky Hammon of the Las Vegas Aces were announced as the two head coaches of the game.

== Game ==
ABC

July 25, 2026
7:30 p.m. CDT

Recap

Team Spoon 129, Team Coop 122
Scoring by quarter: 35-34, 46-30, 24-29, 24-29
Pts: Jonquel Jones 22; Rebs: Jonquel Jones 13; Asts: Jonquel Jones 8	Pts: Kelsey Mitchell 28; Rebs: Dominique Malonga 13; Asts: Paige Bueckers 7

United Center, Chicago, Illinois
Attendance: 19,783
Referees:
- Roy Gulbeyan
- Charles Watson
- Clare Simmons

== Total All-Star selections per team ==
Number of All-Star players per team
Team	Number of players
Atlanta Dream	3
Chicago Sky	0
Connecticut Sun	0
Golden State Valkyries	1
Indiana Fever	3
New York Liberty	2
Washington Mystics	2
Dallas Wings	2
Las Vegas Aces	2
Los Angeles Sparks	2
Minnesota Lynx	3
Phoenix Mercury	1
Seattle Storm	1
Toronto Tempo	1
Portland Fire	0

* Including replacement players

=== 2026 selections per conference ===
Eastern Conference All-Stars
Pos	Player	Team	No. of selections
Starters
G	Caitlin Clark	Indiana Fever	3
F	Aliyah Boston	Indiana Fever	4
G	Kelsey Mitchell	Indiana Fever	4
F	Breanna Stewart	New York Liberty	8
Reserves
G	Sonia Citron	Washington Mystics	2
G	Allisha Gray	Atlanta Dream	4
G	Rhyne Howard	Atlanta Dream	4
F	Kiki Iriafen	Washington Mystics	2
F	Jonquel Jones	New York Liberty	6
G	Marina Mabrey	Toronto Tempo	1
F	Angel Reese	Atlanta Dream	3

Western Conference All-Stars
Pos	Player	Team	No. of selections
Starters
G	Paige Bueckers	Dallas Wings	2
G	Jessica Shepard	Dallas Wings	1
G	Olivia Miles	Minnesota Lynx	1
F	Natasha Howard	Minnesota Lynx	3
F	A'ja Wilson	Las Vegas Aces	8
F	Gabby Williams	Golden State Valkyries	2
Reserves
F	Dominique Malonga	Seattle Storm	1
F	Nneka Ogwumike	Los Angeles Sparks	11
G	Kelsey Plum	Los Angeles Sparks	5
G	Courtney Williams	Minnesota Lynx	3
G	Jackie Young	Las Vegas Aces	5

== All-Star Weekend ==
In July 2026, it was announced that there will be a Three-Point Contest and Shooting Stars Challenge on Friday, July 24, the night before the All-Star game. The Shooting Stars Challenge replaces the traditional Skills Challenge. Instead, to honour the 30th season of the WNBA, the challenge will consist of four teams of three players each. One legend, one active player, and an up and coming athlete from Nike's EYBL. The purpose is to bring together the past, present, and future stars of women's basketball. The Three-Point Contest is presented by Starry, while the WNBA Shooting Stars is presented by Kia.

=== Three-Point Contest ===
The contestants for the three-point contest were announced on July 21, 2026. Caitlin Clark, Sabrina Ionescu, and Kayla McBride were amongst the original contestants reported to have been invited and declined. However, it was later discovered and confirmed that neither Ionescu, nor McBride received an official invitation to the contest.

The competition is two rounds, with the top two finishers from the first round advancing. Competitors have one minute & 10 seconds & 27 balls to accumulate points. Four racks contain four regular balls worth one point and one "money ball" worth two points. One rack is all money balls. Also, there will be two bonus balls placed randomly on the court, each worth 3 points. The maximum total points in a round is 40. In the event of ties, there will be a 30-second tiebreaker before a winner is determined.

With the win, Azzi Fudd became the first rookie in WNBA history to win the contest, scoring 30 points in the final round, besting Bridget Carleton, who finished with 19.

Player	Team	Position	2026 Mid-season 3-point statistics			1st round	Final round
Player	Team	Position	Made	Attempted	Percent	1st round	Final round
Azzi Fudd	Dallas Wings	Guard	53	137	38.7%	24	30
Bridget Carleton	Portland Fire	Guard	67	179	37.4%	27	19
Rhyne Howard	Atlanta Dream	Guard	79	223	35.4%	20	DNQ
Janelle Salaün	Golden State Valkyries	Guard	67	170	39.4%	19	DNQ
Marina Mabrey	Toronto Tempo	Guard	82	209	39.2%	18	DNQ
Natisha Hiedeman	Seattle Storm	Guard	58	169	34.3%	17	DNQ

=== Shooting Stars ===
The contestants for the Shooting Stars were announced on July 21, 2026. The four teams paired a current player with a legend. These four squads were Minnesota, Seattle, Washington, and a dual team of Detroit/Dallas, which combined the histories of the Dallas Wings with the Detroit Shock, the latter of which relocated to Tulsa before moving a second time, ultimately rebranding to the Dallas Wings.

The following were paired together:

Rebekkah Brunson and Courtney Williams for Minnesota

Lauren Jackson and Flau'jae Johnson for Seattle

Elena Delle Donne and Shakira Austin for Washington

Deanna Nolan and Jessica Shepard for Detroit/Dallas

In addition, four Nike EYBL standout athletes would be randomly assigned to one of the 4 teams. These four are Jezelle "GG" Banks, Ryan Carter, Morghan Reckley, and Tatianna Griffin.

Also, Cynthia Cooper and Teresa Weatherspoon, the two general managers of this year's all-star teams, will serve as the individual to throw the ball in to two squads each at random.

The teams will have 70 seconds to score as many points as possible while rotating among seven shooting locations around the court. The top two teams will advance to the final round, with the highest score winning the competition.

Team	Legend	Player	EYBL Rookie	1st round	Final round
Washington	Elena Delle Donne	Shakira Austin	GG Banks	39 points	31 points
Seattle	Lauren Jackson	Flau'jae Johnson	Tatianna Griffin	26 points	24 points
Detroit/Dallas	Deanna Nolan	Jessica Shepard	Morghan Reckley	20 points	DNQ
Minnesota	Rebekkah Brunson	Courtney Williams	Ryan Carter	19 points	DNQ
