= 2026 Portland Fire season =

Inaugural season of the Portland Fire

- Head coach: Alex Sarama
- Arena: Moda Center

Results
- Record: 17–27 (.386)
- Place: 5th (Western)
- Playoff finish: Did not qualify

The 2026 Portland Fire season was the franchise's inaugural season in the Women's National Basketball Association and first under head coach Alex Sarama.

== Draft ==
The draft was held on April 13, 2026, at 7:30 pm EDT, and broadcast on ESPN.

Round	Pick	Player	Position	Nationality	College/Club	Outcome	Ref.
1	7	Iyana Martín	PG	Spain	Perfumerias Avenida (Spain)		
2	17	Frieda Bühner	PF	Germany	Movistar Estudiantes (Spain)	Signed a Player Development Contract	
3	37	Taylor Bigby	SG	USA	TCU	Rights traded to Connecticut Sun	

== Transactions ==
=== Front office and coaching ===
Date	Details	Ref.
June 27, 2025	Named Clare Hamill as interim president	
September 15, 2025	Hired Vanja Černivec as general manager	
October 14, 2025	Hired Ashley Battle as Vice President, Basketball Operations, Strategy and Innovation	
October 17, 2025	Hired Alex Sarama as head coach	
November 24, 2025	Hired Brittni Donaldson as assistant coach and assistant general manager	
December 22, 2025	Hired Sylvia Fowles as assistant coach	
March 19, 2026	Hired Danielle Boiago as assistant coach	
March 19, 2026	Hired Sefu Bernard as assistant coach and director of learning and development	
March 19, 2026	Hired Jacob Lloyd as assistant general manager	

=== Expansion draft ===
On April 3, 2026, an expansion draft was held to help fill the roster for the Fire.

Player	Former Team	Ref.
Bridget Carleton	Minnesota Lynx	
Carla Leite	Golden State Valkyries	
Luisa Geiselsöder	Dallas Wings	
Emily Engstler	Washington Mystics	
Maya Caldwell	Atlanta Dream	
Chloe Bibby	Indiana Fever	
Haley Jones	Dallas Wings	
Nyadiew Puoch	Atlanta Dream	
Sarah Ashlee Barker	Los Angeles Sparks	
Sug Sutton	Washington Mystics	
Nika Mühl	Seattle Storm	

=== Trades ===
April
April 1	To Portland Fire 2026 No. 17 draft pick	To Chicago Sky 2026 No. 21 draft pick Protection from Fire during 2026 WNBA expansion draft
April 13	To Portland Fire Serah Williams	To Connecticut Sun Taylor Bigby; 2027 third-round draft pick

=== Free agency ===
==== Additions ====
Player	Date	Notes	Former Team	Ref.

== Roster ==
Portland Fire roster
Players
Coaches

Pos.	No.	Nat.	Name	Height	Weight	DOB	From	Yrs
G	3	(United States)	Barker, Sarah Ashlee (injured)	6' 0" (1.83m)	173 lb (78kg)	2001-09-10	Alabama	1
F	20	(Germany)	Bühner, Frieda	6' 1" (1.85m)	175 lb (79kg)	2004-05-28	Germany	R
G/F	6	(Canada)	Carleton, Bridget	6' 2" (1.88m)	190 lb (86kg)	1997-05-22	Iowa State	7
F/C	17	(Spain)	DiLeo, Megan	6' 4" (1.93m)	208 lb (94kg)	1996-12-13	Iowa	7
F	21	(United States)	Engstler, Emily	6' 1" (1.85m)	184 lb (83kg)	2000-05-01	Louisville	4
F	1	(United States)	Feagin, Sania (injured)	6' 3" (1.91m)		2003-03-15	South Carolina	1
C	15	(Germany)	Geiselsöder, Luisa	6' 4" (1.93m)	204 lb (93kg)	2000-02-10	Germany	1
G	2	(United States)	Harrison, Jordan	5' 6" (1.68m)		2004-04-26	West Virginia	R
G	0	(France)	Leite, Carla	5' 9" (1.75m)	151 lb (68kg)	2004-04-16	Tony Parker Academy (FRA)	1
G	7	(Slovenia)	Oblak, Teja	5' 8" (1.73m)		1990-12-20	Slovenia	R
F	24	(United States)	Osborne, Charisma	5' 9" (1.75m)	166 lb (75kg)	2001-07-03	UCLA	1
F	13	(Australia)	Puoch, Nyadiew	6' 3" (1.91m)	167 lb (76kg)	2004-06-23	Australia	R
G	44	(United Kingdom)	Samuelson, Karlie	6' 0" (1.83m)	160 lb (73kg)	1995-05-10	Stanford	7
C	25	(United States)	Williams, Serah	6' 4" (1.93m)		2004-01-17	Connecticut	R
G	77	(United Kingdom)	Winterburn, Holly	5' 11" (1.8m)		2000-10-01	East London (GBR)	R
G	—	(United States)	Ayrault, Julia (S)	6' 2" (1.88m)			Michigan State	–
G	—	(Spain)	Martín, Iyana (DP)	5' 9" (1.75m)		2006-01-18	Spain	–
G	10	(Croatia)	Mühl, Nika (injured)	6' 0" (1.83m)	156 lb (71kg)	2001-04-09	Connecticut	1

Head coach
(United Kingdom) Alex Sarama (Nottingham)
Assistant coaches
(United States) Sefu Bernard
(United States) Danielle Boiago
(United States) Brittni Donaldson (Northern Iowa)
(United States) Sylvia Fowles (LSU)

Legend

- (C) Team captain
- (DP) Unsigned draft pick
- (FA) Free agent
- (S) Suspended
- Injured

WNBA roster page

East
ATL
CHI
CON
IND
NY
TOR
WAS
West
DAL
GS
LV
LA
MIN
PHO
POR
SEA

=== Depth chart ===
Pos.	Starter	Bench
PG	Sug Sutton	Carla Leite; Kamiah Smalls
SG	Bridget Carleton	Sarah Ashlee Barker; Holly Winterburn; Karlie Samuelson
SF	Emily Engstler	Haley Jones
PF	Nyadiew Puoch	Frieda Bühner
C	Luisa Geiselsöder	Megan Gustafson; Serah Williams

== Schedule ==
=== Preseason ===
2026 pre-season game log
Total: 0–2 (Home: 0–1; Road: 0–1)
April / May: 0–2 (Home: 0–1; Road: 0–1)

Game	Date	Team	Score	High points	High rebounds	High assists	Location Attendance	Record
1	April 29	@ Seattle	L 81–91	Luisa Geiselsöder (15)	Engstler, Jones (7)	Carla Leite (5)	Climate Pledge Arena; 8,627	0–1
2	May 3	Los Angeles	L 75–85	Puoch, Williams (12)	Serah Williams (8)	Jordan Harrison (4)	Moda Center; 13.550	0–2

2026 pre-season schedule

=== Regular season ===
2026 game log
Total: 17–27 (Home: 9–13; Road: 8–14)
May: 6–4 (Home: 4–3; Road: 2–1)

Game	Date	Team	Score	High points	High rebounds	High assists	Location Attendance	Record
1	May 9	Chicago	L 83–98	Carla Leite (18)	Luisa Geiselsöder (7)	Carleton, Harrison (4)	Moda Center; 19,335	0–1
2	May 12	New York	W 98–96	Bridget Carleton (26)	Geiselsöder, Jones (5)	Carla Leite (6)	Moda Center; 12,386	1–1
3	May 14	New York	82–100	Megan Gustafson (14)	Carleton, Geiselsöder (5)	Sug Sutton (8)	Moda Center; 13,087	1–2
4	May 18	Connecticut	W 83–82	Barker, Carleton (18)	Carleton, Williams (5)	Sug Sutton (5)	Moda Center; 12,010	2–2
5	May 20	@ Indiana	L 73–90	Bridget Carleton (16)	Barker, Gustafson (6)	Sug Sutton (4)	Gainbridge Fieldhouse; 14,010	2–3
6	May 23	@ Toronto	W 99–80	Emily Engstler (16)	Emily Engstler (7)	Leite, Oblak (9)	Coca-Cola Coliseum; 8,210	3–3
7	May 25	@ New York	W 81–74	Carla Leite (18)	Barker, Engstler, Geiselsöder (5)	Teja Oblak (4)	Barclays Center; 13,881	4–3
8	May 27	Connecticut	W 71–61	Carla Leite (20)	Sarah Ashlee Barker (11)	Carleton, Leite (3)	Moda Center; 11,945	5–3
9	May 29	Atlanta	L 66–86	Sarah Ashlee Barker (14)	Serah Williams (6)	Holly Winterburn (7)	Moda Center; 13,602	5–4
10	May 30	Indiana	W 100–84	Megan Gustafson (22)	Emily Engstler (10)	Carla Leite (12)	Moda Center; 19,347	6–4

June : 2–8 (Home: 2–2; Road: 0–6)

Game	Date	Team	Score	High points	High rebounds	High assists	Location Attendance	Record
11	June 2	@ Golden State	L 77–95	Megan Gustafson (13)	Engstler, Gustafson (8)	Carla Leite (7)	Chase Center; 18,064	6–5
12	June 5	Phoenix	L 72–78	Sarah Ashlee Barker (15)	Sarah Ashlee Barker (7)	Leite, Oblak (4)	Moda Center; 12,046	6–6
13	June 7	@ Los Angeles	L 72–89	Megan Gustafson (16)	Megan Gustafson (11)	Sarah Ashlee Barker (7)	Crypto.com Arena; 11,227	6–7
14	June 11	Las Vegas	L 89–105	Carla Leite (18)	Emily Engstler (6)	Carla Leite (8)	Moda Center; 13,178	6–8
15	June 13	Dallas	W 84–83	Bridget Carleton (20)	Engstler, Gustafson (6)	Carla Leite (8)	Moda Center; 14,612	7–8
16	June 15	@ Minnesota	L 74–107	Bühner, Leite (10)	Teja Oblak (6)	Teja Oblak (5)	Target Center; 10,812	7–9
17	June 17	Seattle	W 94–89	Bridget Carleton (24)	Barker, Engstler (6)	Carla Leite (10)	Moda Center; 13,084	8–9
18	June 24	@ Chicago	L 78–101	Megan Gustafson (17)	Barker, Carleton (5)	Carla Leite (6)	Wintrust Arena; 7,468	8–10
19	June 26	@ Chicago	L 94–124	Bridget Carleton (20)	Bühner, Engstler (5)	Carla Leite (4)	Wintrust Arena; 7,228	8–11
20	June 28	@ Washington	L 123–124 (4OT)	Carla Leite (32)	Emily Engstler (11)	Carla Leite (9)	CareFirst Arena; 4,200	8–12

July : 3–6 (Home: 0–3; Road: 3–3)

Game	Date	Team	Score	High points	High rebounds	High assists	Location Attendance	Record
21	July 4	@ Seattle	W 77–72	Carla Leite (20)	Megan Gustafson (9)	Carla Leite (4)	Climate Pledge Arena; 10,251	9–12
22	July 9	Las Vegas	L 80–88	Carla Leite (13)	Emily Engstler (7)	Carla Leite (5)	Moda Center; 13,470	9–13
23	July 11	@ Atlanta	W 102–92	Megan Gustafson (17)	Emily Engstler (11)	Carla Leite (10)	Gateway Center Arena; 3,577	10–13
24	July 14	@ Connecticut	L 87–90	Carla Leite (18)	Emily Engstler (6)	Emily Engstler (7)	Mohegan Sun Arena; 8,917	10–14
25	July 16	@ Washington	W 75–56	Carla Leite (14)	Sarah Ashlee Barker (7)	Engstler, Leite (5)	CareFirst Arena; 4,200	11–14
26	July 18	@ Minnesota	L 93–101	Bridget Carleton (22)	Bridget Carleton (8)	Carla Leite (7)	Target Center; 12,101	11–15
27	July 22	Dallas	L 97–101	Megan DiLeo (21)	Bridget Carleton (5)	Carla Leite (11)	Moda Center; 17,206	11–16
All-Star Game
28	July 28	@ Las Vegas	L 83–98	Megan DiLeo (20)	Emily Engstler (10)	Bridget Carleton (4)	Michelob Ultra Arena; 10,240	11–17
29	July 31	Indiana	L 98–112	Bridget Carleton (26)	Samuelson, Williams (4)	Carla Leite (12)	Moda Center; 19,959	11–18

August : 5–6 (Home: 2–4; Road: 3–2)

Game	Date	Team	Score	High points	High rebounds	High assists	Location Attendance	Record
30	August 2	Los Angeles	L 101–106	Bridget Carleton (24)	Bridget Carleton (11)	Carla Leite (8)	Moda Center; 13,638	11–19
31	August 6	Toronto	W 97–83	Carla Leite (27)	Bridget Carleton (11)	Carla Leite (11)	Moda Center; 12,379	12–19
32	August 8	Seattle	W 100–93	Bridget Carleton (24)	Jordan Harrison (7)	Holly Winterburn (7)	Moda Center; 15,294	13–19
33	August 12	Minnesota	L 81–85	Bridget Carleton (16)	DiLeo, Engstler (7)	Teja Oblak (9)	Moda Center; 13,270	13–20
34	August 14	@ Seattle	W 84–82	Holly Winterburn (20)	Carleton, DiLeo (9)	Carla Leite (6)	Climate Pledge Arena; 12,596	14–20
35	August 16	@ Phoenix	W 88–85	Carla Leite (23)	Emily Engstler (7)	Carla Leite (5)	Mortgage Matchup Center; 16,513	15–20
36	August 21	@ Toronto	L 79–82	Bridget Carleton (18)	Megan DiLeo (6)	Carla Leite (6)	Rogers Arena; 12,414	15–21
37	August 23	Washington	L 100–105	Carla Leite (27)	Emily Engstler (6)	Carla Leite (11)	Moda Center; 14,860	15–22
38	August 25	@ Dallas	L 78–96	Carleton, Samuelson (14)	Emily Engstler (15)	Carla Leite (7)	College Park Center; 6,251	15–23
39	August 28	@ Atlanta	W 101–83	Carla Leite (26)	Carleton, Engstler (6)	Carla Leite (6)	Gateway Center Arena; 3,575	16–23
40	August 30	Golden State	L 69–86	DiLeo, Engstler (12)	Carleton, Williams (5)	Teja Oblak (7)	Moda Center; 15,146	16–24

September : 1–3 (Home: 1–1; Road: 0–2)

Game	Date	Team	Score	High points	High rebounds	High assists	Location Attendance	Record
41	September 17	Phoenix	L 91–94	Emily Engstler (21)	Engstler, Williams (7)	Jordan Harrison (10)	Moda Center; 13,641	16–25
42	September 18	@ Golden State	L 66–82	Frieda Bühner (14)	Emily Engstler (9)	Carla Leite (6)	Chase Center; 18,064	16–26
43	September 20	@ Los Angeles	L 84–105	Carla Leite (23)	Megan DiLeo (5)	Carla Leite (5)	Crypto.com Arena; 17,703	16–27
44	September 22	Golden State	W 90–82 (OT)	Bridget Carleton (26)	Emily Engstler (11)	Jordan Harrison (10)	Moda Center; 14,815	17–27

2026 season schedule

Notes:

- Games highlighted in represent Commissioner's Cup games.

== Standings ==
#	Team	W	L	PCT	GB	Conf.	Home	Road	Cup
1	y — Minnesota Lynx	33	11	.750	–	20–3	15–7	18–4	6–1
2	x — Golden State Valkyries	32	12	.727	1	15–8	17–5	15–7	5–2
3	x — Las Vegas Aces	31	13	.705	2	17–6	15–7	16–6	6–1
4	x — Atlanta Dream	30	14	.682	3	15–5	15–7	15–7	4–2
5	x — Washington Mystics	28	16	.636	5	15–5	15–7	13–9	3–3
6	x — Indiana Fever	28	16	.636	5	14–6	15–7	13–9	5–1
7	x — Dallas Wings	27	17	.614	6	13–10	16–6	11–11	4–3
8	cx – New York Liberty	26	18	.591	7	13–7	14–8	12–10	6–0
9	e — Portland Fire	17	27	.386	16	7–16	9–13	8–14	2–5
10	e — Phoenix Mercury	16	28	.364	17	10–13	7–15	9–13	2–5
11	e — Chicago Sky	16	28	.364	17	4–16	11–11	5–17	1–5
12	e — Los Angeles Sparks	16	28	.364	17	9–14	8–14	8–14	3–4
13	e — Toronto Tempo	11	33	.250	22	5–15	7–15	4–18	2–4
14	e — Connecticut Sun	11	33	.250	22	4–16	8–14	3–19	0–6
15	e — Seattle Storm	8	36	.182	25	1–22	6–16	2–20	0–7

Notes

(#) – League Standing
c – Commissioner's Cup winner
y – Regular season champion
x – Clinched playoff berth
e – Eliminated from playoff contention
Source: Overall standings and Commissioner's Cup Standings
