= 2026 Dallas Wings season =

- Head coach: Jose Fernandez
- Arena: College Park Center; American Airlines Center

Results
- Record: 27–17 (.614)
- Place: 4th (Western)
- Playoff finish: 7th seed Lost in First Round 1–2 to Golden State Valkyries

The 2026 Dallas Wings season was the 29th season of the franchise in the Women's National Basketball Association, their 11th in Dallas – after relocating from Tulsa and Detroit, and the first under head coach Jose Fernandez. The Wings qualified for the 2026 WNBA playoffs as the seventh seed, but lost to the eventual champions Golden State Valkyries in the first round.

== Draft ==
The draft was held on April 13, 2026, at 7:30 pm EDT, and broadcast on ESPN.

Round	Pick	Player	Position	Nationality	College/Club	Outcome	Ref.
1	1	Azzi Fudd	Shooting Guard	United States	UConn	Signed four-year rookie contract on April 15	
3	31	Zee Spearman	Forward	United States	Tennessee	Waived April 26	

== Transactions ==
=== Front office and coaching ===
Date	Details	Ref.
September 30, 2025	Fired head coach Chris Koclanes	
October 28, 2025	Hired Jose Fernandez as head coach	

== Roster ==
Dallas Wings roster
Players
Coaches

Pos.	No.	Nat.	Name	Height	Weight	DOB	From	Yrs
G	5	(United States)	Bueckers, Paige	6' 0" (1.83m)	141 lb (64kg)	2001-10-20	Connecticut	1
F	7	(Israel)	Clark, Alysha	5' 11" (1.8m)	167 lb (76kg)	1987-07-07	Middle Tennessee	13
G	35	(United States)	Fudd, Azzi	5' 11" (1.8m)	165 lb (75kg)	2002-11-11	Connecticut	R
G	10	(United States)	James, Aziaha	5' 10" (1.78m)		2002-11-19	NC State	1
G	2	(United States)	Kelly, Deja	5' 8" (1.73m)		2001-08-09	Oregon	R
F/C	34	(Finland)	Kuier, Awak	6' 4" (1.93m)	168 lb (76kg)	2001-08-19	Finland	3
G	33	(Latvia)	Laksa, Kitija	6' 1" (1.85m)		1996-05-21	South Florida	1
C	28	(China)	Li Yueru	6' 7" (2.01m)		1999-03-28	China	3
G	24	(United States)	Ogunbowale, Arike	5' 8" (1.73m)	165 lb (75kg)	1997-03-02	Notre Dame	7
F	32	(Slovenia)	Shepard, Jessica	6' 4" (1.93m)	175 lb (79kg)	1996-09-11	Notre Dame	5
F	20	(United States)	Siegrist, Maddy	6' 2" (1.88m)	175 lb (79kg)	2000-05-22	Villanova	3
G	1	(United States)	Sims, Odyssey	5' 8" (1.73m)	155 lb (70kg)	1992-07-13	Baylor	12
C	8	(Australia)	Smith, Alanna	6' 4" (1.93m)	177 lb (80kg)	1996-09-10	Stanford	7
G	6	(Italy)	Verona, Costanza	5' 6" (1.68m)		1999-08-06	Italy	R
G	31	(United States)	Williams, Christyn	5' 11" (1.8m)	174 lb (79kg)	2000-05-20	Connecticut	1
G	–	(Mexico)	Lopez Sénéchal, Lou (S)	6' 1" (1.85m)	155 lb (70kg)	1998-05-12	Connecticut	1

Head coach
(United States) Jose Fernandez (FIU)
Assistant coaches
(United States) Camille Smith (North Carolina)
(United States) Mike Neighbors (Arkansas)
(United States) David Adkins (Radford)
(United States) Empress Davenport (Texas)

Legend

- (C) Team captain
- (DP) Unsigned draft pick
- (FA) Free agent
- (S) Suspended
- Injured

WNBA roster page

East
ATL
CHI
CON
IND
NY
TOR
WAS
West
DAL
GS
LV
LA
MIN
PHO
POR
SEA

=== Depth ===
Pos.	Starter	Bench
PG	Paige Bueckers
SG	Arike Ogunbowale
SF
PF
C

== Schedule ==
=== Preseason ===
2026 pre-season game log
Total: 2–0 (Home: 1–0; Road: 1–0)
April / May: 2–0 (Home: 1–0; Road: 1–0)

Game	Date	Team	Score	High points	High rebounds	High assists	Location Attendance	Record
1	April 30	@ Indiana	W 95–80	Paige Bueckers (20)	Maddy Siegrist (11)	Alanna Smith (5)	Gainbridge Fieldhouse; 11,745	1–0
2	May 3	Las Vegas	W 101–84	Aziaha James (18)	Alanna Smith (7)	Paige Bueckers (9)	Moody Center; 10,179	2–0

2026 pre-season schedule

=== Regular season ===
2026 game log
Total: 27–17 (Home: 16–6; Road: 11–11)
May: 5–3 (Home: 2–2; Road: 3–1)

Game	Date	Team	Score	High points	High rebounds	High assists	Location Attendance	Record
1	May 9	@ Indiana	W 107–104	Arike Ogunbowale (22)	Jessica Shepard (9)	Jessica Shepard (9)	Gainbridge Fieldhouse; 17,274	1–0
2	May 12	Atlanta	L 72–77	Arike Ogunbowale (20)	Jessica Shepard (8)	Odyssey Sims (4)	College Park Center; 6,251	1–1
3	May 14	Minnesota	L 86–90	Paige Bueckers (27)	Jessica Shepard (6)	Paige Bueckers (8)	College Park Center; 5,982	1–2
4	May 18	Washington	W 92–69	Paige Bueckers (18)	Jessica Shepard (16)	Paige Bueckers (7)	College Park Center; 6,251	2–2
5	May 20	@ Chicago	W 99–89	Paige Bueckers (24)	Jessica Shepard (10)	Jessica Shepard (12)	Wintrust Arena; 9,025	3–2
6	May 22	@ Atlanta	L 69–86	Awak Kuier (16)	Jessica Shepard (11)	Paige Bueckers (7)	Gateway Center Arena; 3,626	3–3
7	May 24	@ New York	W 91–76	Bueckers, Fudd (24)	Jessica Shepard (11)	Jessica Shepard (6)	Barclays Center; 17,622	4–3
8	May 28	Las Vegas	W 95–87	Fudd, Shepard (22)	Jessica Shepard (20)	Jessica Shepard (10)	College Park Center; 6,251	5–3

June : 6–5 (Home: 4–1; Road: 2–4)

Game	Date	Team	Score	High points	High rebounds	High assists	Location Attendance	Record
9	June 1	Seattle	W 79–56	Aziaha James (18)	Bueckers, Siegrist (9)	Paige Bueckers (7)	College Park Center; 6,251	6–3
10	June 5	@ Los Angeles	W 104–96	Arike Ogunbowale (30)	Jessica Shepard (15)	Paige Bueckers (14)	Crypto.com Arena; 12,828	7–3
11	June 9	@ Minnesota	L 76–100	Paige Bueckers (23)	Jessica Shepard (9)	Arike Ogunbowale (6)	Target Center; 10,907	7–4
12	June 11	Phoenix	W 85–70	Paige Bueckers (31)	Jessica Shepard (10)	Jessica Shepard (7)	College Park Center; 6,251	8–4
13	June 13	@ Portland	L 83–84	Arike Ogunbowale (22)	Jessica Shepard (14)	Aziaha James (4)	Moda Center; 14,612	8–5
14	June 15	Las Vegas	W 96–66	Arike Ogunbowale (22)	Jessica Shepard (15)	Jessica Shepard (9)	College Park Center; 6,251	9–5
15	June 17	@ Golden State	L 80–91	Arike Ogunbowale (21)	Jessica Shepard (10)	Paige Bueckers (8)	Chase Center; 18,064	9–6
16	June 20	Chicago	W 93–92	Jessica Shepard (21)	Jessica Shepard (8)	Paige Bueckers (8)	College Park Center; 6,251	10–6
17	June 22	@ Seattle	W 112–110 (OT)	Paige Bueckers (27)	Jessica Shepard (9)	Jessica Shepard (8)	Climate Pledge Arena; 14,200	11–6
18	June 25	@ Las Vegas	L 84–99	Paige Bueckers (25)	Jessica Shepard (14)	Paige Bueckers (6)	Michelob Ultra Arena; 10,295	11–7
19	June 28	Minnesota	L 77–85	Paige Bueckers (25)	Jessica Shepard (16)	Paige Bueckers (4)	College Park Center; 6,251	11–8

July : 7–3 (Home: 2–2; Road: 5–1)

Game	Date	Team	Score	High points	High rebounds	High assists	Location Attendance	Record
20	July 2	@ Connecticut	W 86–83	Paige Bueckers (25)	Paige Bueckers (7)	Paige Bueckers (7)	PeoplesBank Arena; 14,578	12–8
21	July 5	@ Toronto	W 89–76	Paige Bueckers (22)	Jessica Shepard (15)	Paige Bueckers (7)	Coca-Cola Coliseum; 8,210	13–8
22	July 7	@ New York	W 88–77	Jessica Shepard (22)	Kuier, Shepard (12)	Jessica Shepard (11)	Barclays Center; 17,532	14–8
23	July 10	@ Toronto	W 108–95	Paige Bueckers (34)	Jessica Shepard (17)	Arike Ogunbowale (7)	Bell Centre; 20,996	15–8
24	July 12	Chicago	W 96–91	Paige Bueckers (22)	Li, Shepard (10)	Paige Bueckers (11)	American Airlines Center; 13,236	16–8
25	July 16	New York	Postponed to July 20 due to mechanical issues with New York's charter plane				College Park Center	
26	July 19	Los Angeles	W 90–82	Paige Bueckers (25)	Jessica Shepard (14)	Shepard, Sims (6)	College Park Center; 6,251	17–8
28	July 20	New York	L 98–99 (OT)	Arike Ogunbowale (29)	Jessica Shepard (16)	Sug Sutton (7)	College Park Center; 6,251	17–9
28	July 22	@ Portland	W 101–97	Arike Ogunbowale (24)	Jessica Shepard (15)	Jessica Shepard (10)	Moda Center; 17,206	18–9
All-Star Game
29	July 29	Atlanta	L 81–82	Arike Ogunbowale (24)	Jessica Shepard (14)	Paige Bueckers (6)	College Park Center; 6,251	18–10
30	July 31	@ Washington	L 75–81	Paige Bueckers (23)	Jessica Shepard (6)	Jessica Shepard (8)	CareFirst Arena; 4,200	18–11

August : 6–5 (Home: 6–1; Road: 0–4)

Game	Date	Team	Score	High points	High rebounds	High assists	Location Attendance	Record
31	August 2	Connecticut	W 83–63	Ogunbowale, Shepard (15)	Jessica Shepard (9)	Arike Ogunbowale (5)	College Park Center; 6,251	19–11
32	August 5	@ Washington	L 92–96	Jessica Shepard (22)	Shepard, Smith (11)	Jessica Shepard (7)	CareFirst Arena; 4,200	19–12
33	August 7	Golden State	L 76–94	Paige Bueckers (17)	Jessica Shepard (11)	Odyssey Sims (4)	American Airlines Center; 16,444	19–13
34	August 9	@ Minnesota	L 90–103	Paige Bueckers (23)	Alanna Smith (8)	Paige Bueckers (8)	Target Center; 14,421	19–14
35	August 12	Toronto	W 94–88	Paige Bueckers (22)	Alanna Smith (11)	Paige Bueckers (8)	College Park Center; 6,251	20–14
36	August 14	@ Indiana	L 87–98	Paige Bueckers (29)	Alanna Smith (7)	Paige Bueckers (6)	Gainbridge Fieldhouse; 17,274	20–15
37	August 17	@ Golden State	L 70–78	Paige Bueckers (21)	Kuier, Shepard (7)	Bueckers, Ogunbowale (3)	Chase Center; 18,064	20–16
38	August 20	Indiana	W 91–85	Arike Ogunbowale (32)	Kuier, Shepard (8)	Paige Bueckers (8)	American Airlines Center; 20,297	21–16
39	August 23	Seattle	W 92–70	Paige Bueckers (32)	Jessica Shepard (11)	Arike Ogunbowale (6)	College Park Center; 6,251	22–16
40	August 25	Portland	W 96–78	Paige Bueckers (22)	Awak Kuier (12)	Paige Bueckers (11)	College Park Center; 6,251	23–16
41	August 30	Connecticut	W 97–71	Arike Ogunbowale (18)	Jessica Shepard (10)	Paige Bueckers (6)	College Park Center; 6,251	24–16

September : 3–1 (Home: 2–0; Road: 1–1)

Game	Date	Team	Score	High points	High rebounds	High assists	Location Attendance	Record
42	September 17	Los Angeles	W 97–77	Paige Bueckers (19)	Jessica Shepard (11)	Jessica Shepard (12)	College Park Center; 6,251	25–16
43	September 19	Phoenix	W 87–82	Paige Bueckers (26)	Li, Shepard (6)	Arike Ogunbowale (6)	College Park Center; 6,251	26–16
44	September 21	@ Phoenix	L 86–87	Paige Bueckers (30)	Jessica Shepard (19)	Paige Bueckers (7)	Mortgage Matchup Center; 11,941	26–17
45	September 23	@ Seattle	W 103–91	Paige Bueckers (25)	Jessica Shepard (11)	Jessica Shepard (12)	Climate Pledge Arena; 14,200	27–17

2026 season schedule

Notes:

- Games highlighted in represent Commissioner's Cup games.

=== Playoffs ===
2026 playoff game log
First Round vs. Golden State Valkyries
Lost Series: 1–2

Game	Date	Team	Score	High points	High rebounds	High assists	Location Attendance	Series
1	September 27	@ Golden State	L 80–104	Paige Bueckers (21)	Paige Bueckers (6)	Odyssey Sims (7)	Chase Center; 18,064	0–1
2	September 30	Golden State	W 108–100 (OT)	Arike Ogunbowale (45)	Jessica Shepard (8)	Jessica Shepard (6)	College Park Center; 6,251	1–1
3	October 2	@ Golden State	L 73–77	Arike Ogunbowale (30)	Jessica Shepard (12)	Paige Bueckers (6)	Chase Center; 18,064	1–2

2026 playoff schedule

== Standings ==
#	Team	W	L	PCT	GB	Conf.	Home	Road	Cup
1	y — Minnesota Lynx	33	11	.750	–	20–3	15–7	18–4	6–1
2	x — Golden State Valkyries	32	12	.727	1	15–8	17–5	15–7	5–2
3	x — Las Vegas Aces	31	13	.705	2	17–6	15–7	16–6	6–1
4	x — Atlanta Dream	30	14	.682	3	15–5	15–7	15–7	4–2
5	x — Washington Mystics	28	16	.636	5	15–5	15–7	13–9	3–3
6	x — Indiana Fever	28	16	.636	5	14–6	15–7	13–9	5–1
7	x — Dallas Wings	27	17	.614	6	13–10	16–6	11–11	4–3
8	cx – New York Liberty	26	18	.591	7	13–7	14–8	12–10	6–0
9	e — Portland Fire	17	27	.386	16	7–16	9–13	8–14	2–5
10	e — Phoenix Mercury	16	28	.364	17	10–13	7–15	9–13	2–5
11	e — Chicago Sky	16	28	.364	17	4–16	11–11	5–17	1–5
12	e — Los Angeles Sparks	16	28	.364	17	9–14	8–14	8–14	3–4
13	e — Toronto Tempo	11	33	.250	22	5–15	7–15	4–18	2–4
14	e — Connecticut Sun	11	33	.250	22	4–16	8–14	3–19	0–6
15	e — Seattle Storm	8	36	.182	25	1–22	6–16	2–20	0–7

Notes

(#) – League Standing
c – Commissioner's Cup winner
y – Regular season champion
x – Clinched playoff berth
e – Eliminated from playoff contention
Source: Overall standings and Commissioner's Cup Standings

== Playoffs ==
**First round** Best-of-3
1	Minnesota Lynx	0
8	**New York Liberty**	**2**
4	**Atlanta Dream**	**2**
5	Washington Mystics	0
2	**Golden State Valkyries**	**2**
7	Dallas Wings	1
3	**Las Vegas Aces**	**2**
6	Indiana Fever	1

**Semifinals**; Best-of-5
8	New York Liberty	0
4	**Atlanta Dream**	**3**
2	**Golden State Valkyries**	**3**
3	Las Vegas Aces	0

**Finals**; Best-of-7
4	Atlanta Dream	3
2	**Golden State Valkyries**	**4**

- **Bold** – Series winner
- Italic – Team with home-court-advantage
