= GG Banks =

American basketball player (born 2008)

St. James Performance Academy
- Position: Guard

Personal information
- Born: November 27, 2008 (age 17)
- Listed height: 5 ft 8 in (1.73 m)

Career information
- High school: Ursuline Academy (Wilmington, Delaware); The St. James Performance Academy (Springfield, Virginia)
- College: South Carolina (commit)
Medals
Women's basketball
Representing United States
FIBA U18 AmeriCup
Gold medal – first place	2026 Mexico	Team

Jezelle "GG" Banks (born November 27, 2008) is an American basketball player who attends The St. James Performance Academy. She is a five-star recruit and one of the top players in the 2027 class.

== High school career ==
Banks began her career at Ursuline Academy. During her freshman year she averaged 22.2 points, 3.9 rebounds, 3.4 steals and 3.0 assists per game. Following the season she was named the Gatorade Delaware Player of the Year. During the DIAA girls state championship game, she hit the game-winning free-throw with 1.9 seconds left to help Ursuline defeat Caravel Academy, 49-48. She finished the game 29 points, a team-high seven rebounds and four steals. This was the school's 18th championship in program history, and their first since 2017. She was also named the Delaware High School Coaches Association's Player of the Year, and the Delaware MaxPreps Player of the Year. During her sophomore year she averaged 21.7 points, 4.1 rebounds, 4.8 assists and 3.1 steals per game. Following the season she was named the Gatorade Delaware Player of the Year for the second consecutive year.

On April 26, 2025, she announced she was leaving Ursuline Academy and transferring to The St. James Performance Academy. During her junior year she averaged 14.3 points, 3.7 rebounds, 5.4 assists and 2.4 steals per game, and led St. James Performance Academy to the Chipotle Nationals. In the Nike Elite Youth Basketball League (EYBL) she averaged 19.0 points, 5.5 assists and 3.0 rebounds per game while shooting 47.4% from the floor.

She competed in the Shooting Stars Contest during 2026 WNBA All-Star Game weekend. The event included teams containing a high school player from the EYBL, a current WNBA player, and a retired WNBA legend. Banks competed on Team Washington, along with Elena Delle Donne and Shakira Austin. During the final round against Team Seattle, she hit the game-winning shot from just inside half-court to secure the 31–24 victory.

=== Recruiting ===
Banks is considered a five-star recruit, and ranked the No. 4 player in the 2027 class by ESPN. Her final four schools included Texas, LSU, South Carolina and Ohio State. On October 10, 2026, she committed to play college basketball at South Carolina.

== National team career ==
Banks represented the United States at the 2026 FIBA U18 Women's AmeriCup where she averaged 13.8 points, 6.2 assists, and 2.4 steals per game. During the final against Canada she recorded 14 points, five rebounds, and nine assists to help team USA win a gold medal.
