= 2026 Toronto Tempo season =

Inaugural season of the Toronto Tempo

- Head coach: Sandy Brondello
- Arena: Coca-Cola Coliseum; Scotiabank Arena; Bell Centre; Rogers Arena

Results
- Record: 11–33 (.250)
- Place: 6th (Eastern)
- Playoff finish: Did not qualify

The 2026 Toronto Tempo season was the franchise's inaugural season in the Women's National Basketball Association and first under head coach Sandy Brondello.

== Draft ==
| Round | Pick | Player | Position | Nationality | College/Club | Outcome | Ref. |
|---|---|---|---|---|---|---|---|
| 1 | 6 | Kiki Rice | G | United States | UCLA | | |
| 2 | 22 | Teonni Key | F | United States | Kentucky | | |
| 2 | 26 | Saffron Shiels | G | Australia | Townsville Fire | | |
| 3 | 36 | Charlise Dunn | G | Australia | Davidson | | |

== Transactions ==
=== Front office and coaching ===
| Date | Details | Ref. |
|---|---|---|
| February 20, 2025 | Hired Monica Wright Rogers as General Manager | |
| May 30, 2025 | Hired Eli Horowitz as Assistant General Manager and Senior Vice President of Basketball Strategy | |
| November 4, 2025 | Hired Sandy Brondello as Head Coach | |
| January 15, 2026 | Hired Ciara Carl and Brian Lankton as Assistant Coaches | |

=== Expansion draft ===
On April 3, 2026, an expansion draft was held to help fill the roster for the Tempo.

| Player | Former Team | Ref. |
|---|---|---|
| Julie Allemand | Los Angeles Sparks | |
| Nyara Sabally | New York Liberty | |
| Marina Mabrey | Connecticut Sun | |
| Aaliyah Nye | Las Vegas Aces | |
| Lexi Held | Phoenix Mercury | |
| María Conde | Golden State Valkyries | |
| Maria Kliundikova | Minnesota Lynx | |
| Adja Kane | New York Liberty | |
| Nikolina Milić | Connecticut Sun | |
| Kitija Laksa | Phoenix Mercury | |
| Kristy Wallace | Indiana Fever | |

=== Trades ===
April
| April 1 | To Toronto Tempo 2026 No. 26 draft pick | To Chicago Sky Protection from Tempo during 2026 WNBA expansion draft |

=== Free agency ===
==== Extensions ====
| Player | Date | Notes | Ref. |

==== Additions ====
| Player | Date | Notes | Former Team | Ref. |

== Roster ==
Toronto Tempo roster
Players
Coaches

| Pos. | No. | Nat. | Name | Height | Weight | DOB | From | Yrs |
|---|---|---|---|---|---|---|---|---|
| G | 22 | (Belgium) | Allemand, Julie | 5' 8" (1.73m) | 147 lb (67kg) | 1996-07-07 | Belgium | 3 |
| F | 33 | (France) | Bankole, Ornella | 5' 11" (1.8m) | | 1997-10-17 | France | R |
| C | 5 | (Poland) | Borkowska, Kamila | 6' 7" (2.01m) | | 2002-07-26 | Poland | R |
| F | 10 | (Spain) | Conde, María | 6' 1" (1.85m) | 152 lb (69kg) | 1997-01-14 | Florida State | R |
| C | 14 | (United Kingdom) | Fagbenle, Temi | 6' 4" (1.93m) | 180 lb (82kg) | 1992-09-08 | USC | 4 |
| C | 6 | (South Sudan) | Gakdeng, Maria | 6' 3" (1.91m) | | 2003-06-09 | North Carolina | R |
| G | 00 | (United States) | Green, Zaay | 6' 2" (1.88m) | | 2000-03-25 | Alabama | R |
| F | 21 | (United States) | Harrison, Isabelle | 6' 3" (1.91m) | 183 lb (83kg) | 1993-09-27 | Tennessee | 7 |
| F | 2 | (Lithuania) | Juškaitė, Laura | 6' 2" (1.88m) | 176 lb (80kg) | 1997-09-22 | Lithuania | R |
| F | 7 | (United States) | Key, Teonni | 6' 4" (1.93m) | 170 lb (77kg) | 2003-07-10 | Kentucky | R |
| G | 3 | (United States) | Mabrey, Marina (injured) | 6' 1" (1.85m) | 186 lb (84kg) | 1996-09-14 | Notre Dame | 7 |
| F | 24 | (United States) | Morrow, Aneesah (injured) | 6' 1" (1.85m) | 178 lb (81kg) | 2003-02-02 | LSU | 1 |
| G | 11 | (Canada) | Nurse, Kia | 6' 0" (1.83m) | 195 lb (88kg) | 1996-02-22 | Connecticut | 6 |
| G | 1 | (United States) | Rice, Kiki | 5' 11" (1.8m) | 166 lb (75kg) | 2004-01-04 | UCLA | R |
| C | 8 | (Germany) | Sabally, Nyara | 6' 5" (1.96m) | 204 lb (93kg) | 2000-02-26 | Oregon | 3 |
| G | 20 | (United States) | Sykes, Brittney (injured) | 5' 9" (1.75m) | 154 lb (70kg) | 1994-02-07 | Syracuse | 8 |

Head coach
(Australia) Sandy Brondello
Assistant coaches
(United States) Ciara Carl (North Texas)
(Canada) Carly Clarke
(United States) Sadie Edwards (USC)
(Germany) Olaf Lange
(United States) Brian Lankton (Phoenix College)

Legend

- (C) Team captain
- (DP) Unsigned draft pick
- (FA) Free agent
- (S) Suspended
- Injured

WNBA roster page

East
ATL
CHI
CON
IND
NY
TOR
WAS
West
DAL
GS
LV
LA
MIN
PHO
POR
SEA

=== Depth chart ===
| Pos. | Starter | Bench |
|---|---|---|
| PG |
| SG |
| SF |
| PF |
| C |

== Schedule ==
=== Preseason ===
2026 pre-season game log
Total: 0–2 (Home: 0–1; Road: 0–1)
April / May: 0–2 (Home: 0–1; Road: 0–1)

| Game | Date | Team | Score | High points | High rebounds | High assists | Location Attendance | Record |
|---|---|---|---|---|---|---|---|---|
| 1 | April 29 | Connecticut | L 78–83 | Lexi Held (21) | Balogun, Juškaitė (4) | Rocci, Wallace (3) | Coca-Cola Coliseum; 8,210 | 0–1 |
| 2 | May 1 | @ Minnesota | L 66–73 | Elizabeth Balogun (12) | Fágbénlé, Juškaitė (7) | Allemand, Fágbénlé, Key, Nye, Rice (2) | Target Center; 7,821 | 0–2 |

2026 pre-season schedule

=== Regular season ===
2026 game log
Total: 11–33 (Home: 7–15; Road: 4–18)
May: 5–4 (Home: 2–2; Road: 3–2)

| Game | Date | Team | Score | High points | High rebounds | High assists | Location Attendance | Record |
|---|---|---|---|---|---|---|---|---|
| 1 | May 8 | Washington | L 65–68 | Marina Mabrey (27) | Marina Mabrey (7) | Allemand, Mabrey, Sykes (2) | Coca-Cola Coliseum; 8,210 | 0–1 |
| 2 | May 13 | Seattle | W 86–73 | Marina Mabrey (26) | Conde, Sykes (8) | Allemand, Sykes (6) | Coca-Cola Coliseum; 8,142 | 1–1 |
| 3 | May 15 | @ Los Angeles | L 95–99 | Brittney Sykes (27) | Nyara Sabally (9) | Brittney Sykes (7) | Crypto.com Arena; 11,861 | 1–2 |
| 4 | May 17 | @ Los Angeles | W 106–96 | Brittney Sykes (38) | Teonni Key (7) | Mabrey, Sabally (4) | Crypto.com Arena; 11,648 | 2–2 |
| 5 | May 19 | @ Phoenix | W 98–90 | Brittney Sykes (31) | Rice, Sykes (7) | Brittney Sykes (6) | Mortgage Matchup Center; 9,337 | 3–2 |
| 6 | May 21 | @ Minnesota | L 72–100 | Kia Nurse (23) | Kiki Rice (6) | Rice, Sykes (4) | Target Center; 8,910 | 3–3 |
| 7 | May 23 | Portland | L 80–99 | Mabrey, Rice (19) | Conde, Mabrey, Rice (5) | Marina Mabrey (8) | Coca-Cola Coliseum; 8,210 | 3–4 |
| 8 | May 27 | @ Chicago | W 111–104 | Nyara Sabally (29) | Kiki Rice (8) | Mabrey, Rice (7) | Wintrust Arena; 6,209 | 4–4 |
| 9 | May 30 | Seattle | W 92–73 | Marina Mabrey (18) | Conde, Rice (6) | Allemand, Mabrey (4) | Coca-Cola Coliseum; 8,210 | 5–4 |

June : 4–6 (Home: 3–2; Road: 1–4)

| Game | Date | Team | Score | High points | High rebounds | High assists | Location Attendance | Record |
|---|---|---|---|---|---|---|---|---|
| 10 | June 3 | @ New York | L 82–97 | Mabrey, Sykes (17) | Conde, Sabally (6) | Marina Mabrey (4) | Barclays Center; 14,574 | 5–5 |
| 11 | June 7 | Chicago | W 85–68 | Brittney Sykes (25) | Brittney Sykes (7) | Marina Mabrey (6) | Coca-Cola Coliseum; 8,210 | 6–5 |
| 12 | June 10 | Connecticut | w 106–102 (OT) | Brittney Sykes (38) | Laura Juškaitė (6) | Julie Allemand (4) | Coca-Cola Coliseum; 8,210 | 7–5 |
| 13 | June 12 | @ Washington | L 85–86 | Marina Mabrey (27) | Conde, Harrison (6) | María Conde (4) | CareFirst Arena; 4,200 | 7–6 |
| 14 | June 14 | Atlanta | L 77–102 | Isabelle Harrison (17) | Marina Mabrey (4) | Julie Allemand (6) | Coca-Cola Coliseum; 8,210 | 7–7 |
| 15 | June 16 | @ Indiana | L 91–113 | Laura Juškaitė (19) | Isabelle Harrison (8) | Marina Mabrey (7) | Gainbridge Fieldhouse; 15,017 | 7–8 |
| 16 | June 19 | @ Connecticut | W 101–97 | Marina Mabrey (37) | Temi Fagbenle (9) | Julie Allemand (9) | Mohegan Sun Arena; 7,078 | 8–8 |
| 17 | June 22 | @ Atlanta | L 87–94 | Marina Mabrey (23) | Isabelle Harrison (10) | Mabrey, Nurse (4) | Gateway Center Arena; 9,685 | 8–9 |
| 18 | June 25 | Los Angeles | W 125–97 | Marina Mabrey (53) | Laura Juškaitė (12) | Julie Allemand (14) | Coca-Cola Coliseum; 8,210 | 9–9 |
| 19 | June 27 | Phoenix | L 80–89 | Nyara Sabally (14) | Allemand, Harrison (7) | Julie Allemand (10) | Scotiabank Arena; 15,687 | 9–10 |

July : 1–8 (Home: 1–7; Road: 0–1)

| Game | Date | Team | Score | High points | High rebounds | High assists | Location Attendance | Record |
|---|---|---|---|---|---|---|---|---|
| 20 | July 5 | Dallas | L 76–89 | Marina Mabrey (19) | María Conde (10) | Mabrey, Sabally (5) | Coca-Cola Coliseum; 8,210 | 9–11 |
| 21 | July 8 | Golden State | L 75–83 | Isabelle Harrison (24) | Isabelle Harrison (8) | Julie Allemand (7) | Coca-Cola Coliseum; 8,210 | 9–12 |
| 22 | July 10 | Dallas | L 95–108 | Marina Mabrey (34) | Isabelle Harrison (8) | María Conde (9) | Bell Centre; 20,996 | 9–13 |
| 23 | July 12 | New York | W 93–91 | Marina Mabrey (30) | Harrison, Sabally (7) | Julie Allemand (10) | Bell Centre; 12,724 | 10–13 |
| 24 | July 14 | Washington | L 62–79 | Julie Allemand (15) | Allemand, Harrison (5) | Conde, Mabrey (3) | Coca-Cola Coliseum; 8,210 | 10–14 |
| 25 | July 17 | Atlanta | L 92–111 | Marina Mabrey (26) | Julie Allemand (5) | Julie Allemand (6) | Coca-Cola Coliseum; 8,210 | 10–15 |
| 26 | July 20 | Las Vegas | L 83–109 | Isabelle Harrison (26) | Isabelle Harrison (11) | Marina Mabrey (5) | Coca-Cola Coliseum; 8,210 | 10–16 |
All-Star Game
| 27 | July 28 | @ Minnesota | L 93–100 | Marina Mabrey (25) | María Conde (10) | Julie Allemand (7) | Target Center; 12,121 | 10–17 |
| 28 | July 30 | Minnesota | L 72–104 | Laura Juškaitė (19) | Laura Juškaitė (5) | Julie Allemand (6) | Scotiabank Arena; 18,145 | 10–18 |

August : 1–11 (Home: 1–2; Road: 0–9)

| Game | Date | Team | Score | High points | High rebounds | High assists | Location Attendance | Record |
|---|---|---|---|---|---|---|---|---|
| 29 | August 2 | @ Golden State | L 79–96 | Nyara Sabally (19) | Nyara Sabally (8) | Julie Allemand (6) | Chase Center; 18,064 | 10–19 |
| 30 | August 4 | @ Golden State | L 81–92 | Nyara Sabally (21) | Conde, Sabally (6) | Julie Allemand (8) | Chase Center; 18,064 | 10–20 |
| 31 | August 6 | @ Portland | L 83–97 | Nyara Sabally (17) | Aneesah Morrow (8) | Julie Allemand (12) | Moda Center; 12,379 | 10–21 |
| 32 | August 10 | @ Atlanta | L 95–107 | Marina Mabrey (36) | Nyara Sabally (12) | Kiki Rice (6) | Gateway Center Arena; 3,575 | 10–22 |
| 33 | August 12 | @ Dallas | L 88–94 | Marina Mabrey (23) | Isabelle Harrison (10) | Harrison, Rice (5) | College Park Center; 6,251 | 10–23 |
| 34 | August 18 | Indiana | L 95–101 | Marina Mabrey (22) | Aneesah Morrow (16) | Kiki Rice (6) | Scotiabank Arena; 19,300 | 10–24 |
| 35 | August 19 | @ Washington | L 82–93 | Kiki Rice (19) | Aneesah Morrow (8) | Allemand, Juškaitė, Nurse (4) | CareFirst Arena; 4,200 | 10–25 |
| 36 | August 21 | Portland | W 82–79 | Isabelle Harrison (25) | Isabelle Harrison (10) | Julie Allemand (6) | Rogers Arena; 12,414 | 11–25 |
| 37 | August 23 | Las Vegas | L 78–88 | Kia Nurse (19) | Isabelle Harrison (7) | Kiki Rice (5) | Rogers Arena; 15,877 | 11–26 |
| 38 | August 26 | @ Seattle | L 78–90 | Kiki Rice (24) | Isabelle Harrison (14) | Kiki Rice (5) | Climate Pledge Arena; 11,558 | 11–27 |
| 39 | August 28 | @ Las Vegas | L 73–93 | Isabelle Harrison (15) | Laura Juškaitė (8) | Harrison, Rice (4) | Michelob Ultra Arena; 10,523 | 11–28 |
| 40 | August 29 | @ Phoenix | L 69–101 | Isabelle Harrison (16) | Isabelle Harrison (10) | Kiki Rice (5) | Mortgage Matchup Center; 11,699 | 11–29 |

September : 0–4 (Home: 0–2; Road: 0–2)

| Game | Date | Team | Score | High points | High rebounds | High assists | Location Attendance | Record |
|---|---|---|---|---|---|---|---|---|
| 41 | September 18 | Indiana | L 85–103 | Laura Juškaitė (22) | Isabelle Harrison (9) | Allemand, Rice (5) | Coca-Cola Coliseum; 8,210 | 11–30 |
| 42 | September 20 | New York | L 69–106 | Laura Juškaitė (28) | Isabelle Harrison (8) | Kiki Rice (5) | Coca-Cola Coliseum; 8,210 | 11–31 |
| 43 | September 22 | @ Chicago | L 85–97 | Isabelle Harrison (21) | Isabelle Harrison (13) | Kiki Rice (7) | Wintrust Arena; 8,036 | 11–32 |
| 44 | September 24 | @ Connecticut | L 81–95 | Kiki Rice (28) | Isabelle Harrison (10) | Julie Allemand (5) | Mohegan Sun Arena; 8,911 | 11–33 |

2026 season schedule

Notes:

- Games highlighted in represent Commissioner's Cup games.

== Standings ==
| # | Team | W | L | PCT | GB | Conf. | Home | Road | Cup |
|---|---|---|---|---|---|---|---|---|---|
| 1 | y — Minnesota Lynx | 33 | 11 | .750 | – | 20–3 | 15–7 | 18–4 | 6–1 |
| 2 | x — Golden State Valkyries | 32 | 12 | .727 | 1 | 15–8 | 17–5 | 15–7 | 5–2 |
| 3 | x — Las Vegas Aces | 31 | 13 | .705 | 2 | 17–6 | 15–7 | 16–6 | 6–1 |
| 4 | x — Atlanta Dream | 30 | 14 | .682 | 3 | 15–5 | 15–7 | 15–7 | 4–2 |
| 5 | x — Washington Mystics | 28 | 16 | .636 | 5 | 15–5 | 15–7 | 13–9 | 3–3 |
| 6 | x — Indiana Fever | 28 | 16 | .636 | 5 | 14–6 | 15–7 | 13–9 | 5–1 |
| 7 | x — Dallas Wings | 27 | 17 | .614 | 6 | 13–10 | 16–6 | 11–11 | 4–3 |
| 8 | cx – New York Liberty | 26 | 18 | .591 | 7 | 13–7 | 14–8 | 12–10 | 6–0 |
| 9 | e — Portland Fire | 17 | 27 | .386 | 16 | 7–16 | 9–13 | 8–14 | 2–5 |
| 10 | e — Phoenix Mercury | 16 | 28 | .364 | 17 | 10–13 | 7–15 | 9–13 | 2–5 |
| 11 | e — Chicago Sky | 16 | 28 | .364 | 17 | 4–16 | 11–11 | 5–17 | 1–5 |
| 12 | e — Los Angeles Sparks | 16 | 28 | .364 | 17 | 9–14 | 8–14 | 8–14 | 3–4 |
| 13 | e — Toronto Tempo | 11 | 33 | .250 | 22 | 5–15 | 7–15 | 4–18 | 2–4 |
| 14 | e — Connecticut Sun | 11 | 33 | .250 | 22 | 4–16 | 8–14 | 3–19 | 0–6 |
| 15 | e — Seattle Storm | 8 | 36 | .182 | 25 | 1–22 | 6–16 | 2–20 | 0–7 |

Notes

(#) – League Standing
c – Commissioner's Cup winner
y – Regular season champion
x – Clinched playoff berth
e – Eliminated from playoff contention
Source: Overall standings and Commissioner's Cup Standings
