= 2026 Minnesota Lynx season =

- Head coach: Cheryl Reeve
- Arena: Target Center

Results
- Record: 33–11 (.750)
- Place: 1st (Western)
- Playoff finish: 1st seed Lost in First Round 0–2 to New York Liberty

Media
- Television: Victory+ ESPN; CBS Sports Network; ION; Amazon Prime Video

The 2026 Minnesota Lynx season was the 28th season for the Minnesota Lynx of the Women's National Basketball Association and the 17th under head coach Cheryl Reeve. The team clinched the best record in the league, finishing the regular season with a 33–11 record. However, they were swept and upset by the eighth seed New York Liberty in the first round of the 2026 WNBA playoffs. This marked the first time the top seed lost to the bottom seed since 1997.

== Draft ==
The draft was held on April 13, 2026, at 7:30 pm EDT, and broadcast on ESPN.

Round	Pick	Player	Position	Nationality	College/Club	Outcome	Ref.
1	2	Olivia Miles	G	United States	TCU		
3	45	Lani White	G	United States	Utah		

== Transactions ==
=== Front office and coaching ===
Date	Details	Ref.

== Roster ==
Minnesota Lynx roster
Players
Coaches

Pos.	No.	Nat.	Name	Height	Weight	DOB	From	Yrs
F	55	(Australia)	Bibby, Chloe	6' 2" (1.88m)	194 lb (88kg)	1998-06-15	Maryland	1
F	12	(United States)	Brodie, Nia	6' 1" (1.85m)	177 lb (80kg)	1995-06-11	Northwestern	9
G	6	(Spain)	Buenavida, Elena	5' 9" (1.75m)	194 lb (88kg)	2004-03-08	Spain	R
G	3	(United States)	Caldwell, Maya	5' 11" (1.8m)	160 lb (73kg)	1998-12-15	Georgia	4
C	22	(Czech Republic)	Čechová, Emma (injured)	6' 5" (1.96m)	180 lb (82kg)	2004-07-12	Czech Republic	R
F	24	(United States)	Collier, Napheesa (C)	6' 1" (1.85m)	182 lb (83kg)	1996-09-23	Connecticut	7
G	8	(Belgium)	Delaere, Antonia	5' 11" (1.8m)	155 lb (70kg)	1994-08-01	Belgium	R
F	1	(United States)	Howard, Natasha	6' 3" (1.91m)	172 lb (78kg)	1991-09-02	Florida State	12
C	14	(Hungary)	Juhász, Dorka	6' 5" (1.96m)	201 lb (91kg)	1999-12-18	Connecticut	2
F	2	(United States)	King, Liatu	5' 11" (1.8m)	178 lb (81kg)	2002-02-10	Notre Dame	1
F	7	(Russia)	Kosu, Anastasiia	6' 1" (1.85m)	190 lb (86kg)	2005-04-21	Russia	1
G	21	(United States)	McBride, Kayla	5' 11" (1.8m)	179 lb (81kg)	1992-06-25	Notre Dame	12
G	4	(United States)	McDonald, Aari	5' 6" (1.68m)	141 lb (64kg)	1998-08-20	Arizona	5
G	5	(United States)	Miles, Olivia	5' 10" (1.78m)	168 lb (76kg)	2003-01-29	TCU	R
G	10	(United States)	Williams, Courtney	5' 8" (1.73m)	147 lb (67kg)	1994-05-11	South Florida	10

Head coach
(United States) Cheryl Reeve (La Salle)
Assistant coaches
(United States) Rebekkah Brunson (Georgetown)
(United States) Janel McCarville (Minnesota)
(United States) Eric Thibault (Missouri)
(United States) Lindsay Whalen (Minnesota)
Athletic trainer
(United States) Chuck Barta (UW–La Crosse)

Legend

- (C) Team captain
- (DP) Unsigned draft pick
- (FA) Free agent
- (S) Suspended
- Injured

WNBA roster page

East
ATL
CHI
CON
IND
NY
TOR
WAS
West
DAL
GS
LV
LA
MIN
PHO
POR
SEA

=== Depth ===
Pos.	Starter	Bench
PG	Olivia Miles	Aari McDonald
SG	Courtney Williams	Maya Caldwell Antonia Delaere
SF	Kayla McBride	Anastasiia Kosu Liatu King
PF	Napheesa Collier	Nia Brodie Chloe Bibby
C	Natasha Howard	Dorka Juhász

== Schedule ==
=== Preseason ===
2026 pre-season game log
Total: 3–0 (Home: 2–0; Road: 1–0)
April: 3–0 (Home: 2–0; Road: 1–0)

Game	Date	Team	Score	High points	High rebounds	High assists	Location Attendance	Record
1	April 25	@ Washington	W 77–66	Poffenbarger, Sherrod (9)	Saylor Poffenbarger (13)	Courtney Williams (3)	CareFirst Arena; 4,200	1–0
2	April 27	Nigeria	W 88–79	Courtney Williams (17)	Olivia Miles (5)	Eliška Hamzová (7)	T-Mobile Center; 6,510	2–0
3	May 1	Toronto	W 73–66	Emma Čechová (16)	Čechová, Miles (6)	Courtney Williams (6)	Target Center; 7,821	3–0

2026 pre-season schedule

=== Regular season ===
2026 game log
Total: 33–11 (Home: 15–7; Road: 18–5)
May: 6–2 (Home: 2–2; Road: 4–0)

Game	Date	Team	Score	High points	High rebounds	High assists	Location Attendance	Record
1	May 10	Atlanta	L 90–91	Olivia Miles (21)	Courtney Williams (6)	Olivia Miles (8)	Target Center; 10,821	0–1
2	May 12	@ Phoenix	W 88–84	Howard, McBride (14)	Natasha Howard (11)	Olivia Miles (7)	Mortgage Matchup Center; 10,826	1–1
3	May 14	@ Dallas	W 90–86	Natasha Howard (26)	Coffey, McBride (8)	Olivia Miles (6)	College Park Center; 5,982	2–1
4	May 17	Chicago	L 79–86	Kayla McBride (20)	Natasha Howard (9)	Natasha Howard (7)	Target Center; 10,001	2–2
5	May 21	Toronto	W 100–72	Maya Caldwell (16)	Courtney Williams (8)	Olivia Miles (5)	Target Center; 8,910	3–2
6	May 23	@ Chicago	W 85–75	Natasha Howard (26)	Natasha Howard (14)	Howard, Miles (5)	Wintrust Arena; 7,030	4–2
7	May 27	Atlanta	W 96–81	Courtney Williams (25)	Natasha Howard (8)	Olivia Miles (8)	Target Center; 9,912	5–2
8	May 29	@ Chicago	W 79–58	Nia Coffey (20)	Nia Coffey (8)	Olivia Miles (6)	Wintrust Arena; 7,004	6–2

June : 9–2 (Home: 4–1; Road: 5–1)

Game	Date	Team	Score	High points	High rebounds	High assists	Location Attendance	Record
9	June 1	@ Phoenix	W 111–97	Courtney Williams (30)	Coffey, McCowan, Kosu (6)	Olivia Miles (9)	Mortgage Matchup Center; 9,234	7–2
10	June 4	Golden State	W 87–84	Olivia Miles (28)	Natasha Howard (10)	Olivia Miles (7)	Target Center; 9,105	8–2
11	June 6	Seattle	W 88–68	Natasha Howard (27)	Nia Coffey (8)	Courtney Williams (7)	Target Center; 10,801	9–2
12	June 9	Dallas	W 100–76	Olivia Miles (24)	Coffey, Williams (8)	Olivia Miles (6)	Target Center; 10,907	10–2
13	June 13	@ Las Vegas	L 97–100	Olivia Miles (29)	Natasha Howard (9)	Kayla McBride (5)	Michelob Ultra Arena; 10,330	10–3
14	June 15	Portland	W 107–74	Natasha Howard (18)	Howard, McBride (6)	Antonia Delaere (7)	Target Center; 10,812	11–3
15	June 17	@ Los Angeles	W 99–83	Olivia Miles (31)	Natasha Howard (9)	Courtney Williams (5)	Crypto.com Arena; 11,481	12–3
16	June 19	@ Golden State	W 81–75	Nia Coffey (22)	Courtney Williams (12)	Courtney Williams (5)	Chase Center; 18,064	13–3
17	June 21	Washington	L 79–84	Olivia Miles (22)	Nia Coffey (8)	Olivia Miles (6)	Target Center; 11,610	13–4
18	June 24	@ Washington	W 78–76	Howard, Miles (21)	Natasha Howard (15)	Coffey, Miles (5)	CareFirst Arena; 4,200	14–4
19	June 28	@ Dallas	W 85–77	Howard, Miles (21)	Natasha Howard (14)	Olivia Miles (8)	College Park Center; 6,251	15–4

July : 9–2 (Home: 5–1; Road: 4–1)

Game	Date	Team	Score	High points	High rebounds	High assists	Location Attendance	Record
20	July 3	@ New York	L 86–99	Kayla McBride (18)	Natasha Howard (6)	Olivia Miles (5)	Barclays Center; 15,345	15–5
21	July 6	Connecticut	L 89–90	Kayla McBride (28)	Courtney Williams (9)	Courtney Williams (6)	Target Center; 10,810	15–6
22	July 8	@ Connecticut	W 86–80	Kayla McBride (23)	Natasha Howard (10)	Courtney Williams (7)	Mohegan Sun Arena; 8,187	16–6
23	July 11	New York	W 90–85	Kayla McBride (25)	Courtney Williams (12)	Nia Coffey (5)	Target Center; 12,405	17–6
24	July 13	Phoenix	W 104–100	Kayla McBride (37)	Courtney Williams (7)	Olivia Miles (8)	Target Center; 10,221	18–6
25	July 15	Los Angeles	W 96–87	Kayla McBride (24)	Natasha Howard (10)	Natasha Howard (6)	Target Center; 16,410	19–6
26	July 18	Portland	W 101–93	Kayla McBride (24)	Natasha Howard (7)	Olivia Miles (10)	Target Center; 12,101	20–6
27	July 20	@ Seattle	W 105–102	Kayla McBride (33)	Natasha Howard (12)	Olivia Miles (8)	Climate Pledge Arena; 12,500	21–6
28	July 22	@ Seattle	W 86–76	Napheesa Collier (24)	Napheesa Collier (10)	Miles, Williams (6)	Climate Pledge Arena; 13,106	22–6
All-Star Game
29	July 28	Toronto	W 100–93	Olivia Miles (24)	Collier, Howard, Miles (6)	Olivia Miles (8)	Target Center; 12,121	23–6
30	July 30	@ Toronto	W 104–72	Collier, Miles, Williams (16)	Natasha Howard (8)	Courtney Williams (5)	Scotiabank Arena; 18,145	24–6

August : 7–3 (Home: 3–2; Road: 4–1)

Game	Date	Team	Score	High points	High rebounds	High assists	Location Attendance	Record
31	August 2	Indiana	W 108–100	Olivia Miles (28)	Napheesa Collier (8)	Napheesa Collier (7)	Target Center; 16,505	25–6
32	August 6	Los Angeles	L 82–89	Olivia Miles (23)	Collier, Miles, Williams (8)	Napheesa Collier (6)	Target Center; 12,824	25–7
33	August 8	Las Vegas	W 98–87	Olivia Miles (26)	Natasha Howard (8)	Miles, Williams (7)	Target Center; 14,101	26–7
34	August 9	Dallas	W 103–90	Kayla McBride (43)	Napheesa Collier (8)	Olivia Miles (13)	Target Center; 14,421	27–7
35	August 12	@ Portland	W 85–81	Napheesa Collier (20)	Natasha Howard (12)	Olivia Miles (7)	Moda Center; 13,270	28–7
36	August 15	@ Las Vegas	W 92–87	Olivia Miles (23)	Natasha Howard (11)	Olivia Miles (8)	Michelob Ultra Arena; 10,415	29–7
37	August 19	@ Golden State	W 77–66	McBride, Miles (20)	Napheesa Collier (8)	Miles, Williams (7)	Chase Center; 18,064	30–7
38	August 21	@ Washington	W 94–84	Olivia Miles (24)	Natasha Howard (7)	Courtney Williams (8)	CareFirst Arena; 4,200	31–7
39	August 24	Golden State	L 66–80	Natasha Howard (13)	Collier, Howard (7)	Olivia Miles (5)	Target Center; 16,001	31–8
40	August 30	@ Atlanta	L 81–89	Olivia Miles (21)	Collier, Howard (7)	Natasha Howard (7)	Gateway Center Arena; 3,614	31–9

September : 2–2 (Home: 1–1; Road: 1–1)

Game	Date	Team	Score	High points	High rebounds	High assists	Location Attendance	Record
41	September 18	New York	L 81–93	Olivia Miles (20)	Olivia Miles (8)	Olivia Miles (5)	Target Center; 15,710	31–10
42	September 20	Connecticut	W 101–89	Napheesa Collier (23)	Natasha Howard (11)	McBride, Miles (6)	Mohegan Sun Arena; 8,911	32–10
43	September 22	Indiana	L 77–96	Chloe Bibby (15)	Dorka Juhász (12)	Dorka Juhász (6)	Gainbridge Fieldhouse; 16,521	32–11
44	September 24	Indiana	W 86–66	Kayla McBride (22)	Natasha Howard (8)	Courtney Williams (10)	Target Center; 15,221	33–11

2026 season schedule

Notes:

- Games highlighted in represent Commissioner's Cup games.

=== Playoffs ===
2026 playoff game log
First round vs. New York Liberty
Lost Series 0–2

Game	Date	Team	Score	High points	High rebounds	High assists	Location Attendance	Series
1	September 27	New York	L 75–91	Nia Brodie (16)	Olivia Miles (8)	Kayla McBride (6)	Target Center; 12,339	0–1
2	September 29	@ New York	L 71–87	Courtney Williams (18)	Courtney Williams (8)	Courtney Williams (5)	Barclays Center; 17,593	0–2

2026 playoff schedule

== Standings ==
#	Team	W	L	PCT	GB	Conf.	Home	Road	Cup
1	y — Minnesota Lynx	33	11	.750	–	20–3	15–7	18–4	6–1
2	x — Golden State Valkyries	32	12	.727	1	15–8	17–5	15–7	5–2
3	x — Las Vegas Aces	31	13	.705	2	17–6	15–7	16–6	6–1
4	x — Atlanta Dream	30	14	.682	3	15–5	15–7	15–7	4–2
5	x — Washington Mystics	28	16	.636	5	15–5	15–7	13–9	3–3
6	x — Indiana Fever	28	16	.636	5	14–6	15–7	13–9	5–1
7	x — Dallas Wings	27	17	.614	6	13–10	16–6	11–11	4–3
8	cx – New York Liberty	26	18	.591	7	13–7	14–8	12–10	6–0
9	e — Portland Fire	17	27	.386	16	7–16	9–13	8–14	2–5
10	e — Phoenix Mercury	16	28	.364	17	10–13	7–15	9–13	2–5
11	e — Chicago Sky	16	28	.364	17	4–16	11–11	5–17	1–5
12	e — Los Angeles Sparks	16	28	.364	17	9–14	8–14	8–14	3–4
13	e — Toronto Tempo	11	33	.250	22	5–15	7–15	4–18	2–4
14	e — Connecticut Sun	11	33	.250	22	4–16	8–14	3–19	0–6
15	e — Seattle Storm	8	36	.182	25	1–22	6–16	2–20	0–7

Notes

(#) – League Standing
c – Commissioner's Cup winner
y – Regular season champion
x – Clinched playoff berth
e – Eliminated from playoff contention
Source: Overall standings and Commissioner's Cup Standings

== Playoffs ==
**First round** Best-of-3
1	Minnesota Lynx	0
8	**New York Liberty**	**2**
4	**Atlanta Dream**	**2**
5	Washington Mystics	0
2	**Golden State Valkyries**	**2**
7	Dallas Wings	1
3	**Las Vegas Aces**	**2**
6	Indiana Fever	1

**Semifinals**; Best-of-5
8	New York Liberty	0
4	**Atlanta Dream**	**3**
2	**Golden State Valkyries**	**3**
3	Las Vegas Aces	0

**Finals**; Best-of-7
4	Atlanta Dream	3
2	**Golden State Valkyries**	**4**

- **Bold** – Series winner
- Italic – Team with home-court-advantage
