= 2026 Seattle Storm season =

- Head coach: Sonia Raman
- Arena: Climate Pledge Arena

Results
- Record: 8–36 (.182)
- Place: 8th (Western)
- Playoff finish: Did not qualify

The 2026 Seattle Storm season was the 27th season for the Seattle Storm of the Women's National Basketball Association and their first under head coach Sonia Raman. The Storm failed to qualify for the playoffs and finished at the bottom of the league standings, with 8 wins and 36 losses—the worst record in franchise history. The team also set the record for most losses in an WNBA season.

== Draft ==
The draft was held on April 13, 2026, at 7:30 pm EDT, and broadcast on ESPN.

Round	Pick	Player	Position	Nationality	College/Club	Outcome	Ref.
1	3	Awa Fam	C	Spain/Senegal	Valencia (Spain)	Signed rookie contract April 16 Made opening day roster	
1	14	Taina Mair	G	United States	Duke	Signed rookie contract April 16 Made opening day roster Waived May 4 Signed player development contract May 6	
2	16	Marta Suárez	F	Spain	TCU	Traded to the Golden State Valkyries with a 2028 second-round pick in exchange for Flau'Jae Johnson (No. 8)	
3	39	Grace VanSlooten	F	United States	Michigan State	Signed rookie contract April 17 Made opening day roster Waived May 18	

== Transactions ==
=== Front office and coaching ===
Date	Details	Ref.
September 21, 2025	Announced that Head Coach Noelle Quinn's contract will not be renewed for the 2026 season.	
October 28, 2025	Sonia Raman	

=== Free agency ===
==== Core Designation ====
Player	Date	Notes	Ref.
Ezi Magbegor	April 12, 2026	Three-Year Extension	

==== Re-signed/Extensions ====
Player	Date	Notes	Ref.
Zia Cooke	April 11, 2026	One-Year Contract	
Mackenzie Holmes	April 11, 2026	One-Year Contract	

==== Additions ====
Player	Date	Notes	Former Team	Ref.
Natisha Hiedeman	April 11, 2026	Two-Year Contract	Minnesota Lynx	
Stefanie Dolson	April 12, 2026	Single-Year Contract	Washington Mystics	
Jade Melbourne	April 12, 2026	Single-Year Contract	Washington Mystics	

==== Subtractions / unsigned ====
Player	Date	Reason	New Team	Ref.]
Tiffany Mitchell	September 18	Free Agency - unrestricted	—	
Nika Mühl	April 3	Expansion Draft	Portland Fire	
Nneka Ogwumike	April 9	Free Agency - unrestricted	Los Angeles Sparks	
Brittney Sykes	April 10	Free Agency - unrestricted	Toronto Tempo	
Erica Wheeler	April 11	Free Agency - unrestricted	Los Angeles Sparks	
Skylar Diggins	April 11	Free Agency - unrestricted	Chicago Sky	
Gabby Williams	April 12	Free Agency - unrestricted	Golden State Valkyries	

== Roster ==
Seattle Storm roster
Players
Coaches

Pos.	No.	Nat.	Name	Height	Weight	DOB	From	Yrs
G	7	(United States)	Cooke, Zia	5' 9" (1.75m)	163 lb (74kg)	2001-01-09	South Carolina	2
C	31	(United States)	Dolson, Stefanie	6' 5" (1.96m)	235 lb (107kg)	1992-01-08	Connecticut	11
C	11	(Spain)	Fam, Awa	6' 4" (1.93m)		2006-06-17	Spain	R
G	2	(United States)	Hiedeman, Natisha	5' 8" (1.73m)	132 lb (60kg)	1997-02-10	Marquette	7
F	54	(United States)	Holmes, Mackenzie	6' 3" (1.91m)		2000-11-01	Indiana	1
G/F	23	(United States)	Horston, Jordan	6' 2" (1.88m)	165 lb (75kg)	2001-05-21	Tennessee	2
G	4	(United States)	Johnson, Flau'jae	5' 10" (1.78m)		2003-11-03	LSU	R
C	13	(Australia)	Magbegor, Ezi	6' 4" (1.93m)	181 lb (82kg)	1999-08-13	Australia	6
G	22	(United States)	Mair, Taina	5' 9" (1.75m)		2003-11-20	Duke	R
F/C	14	(France)	Malonga, Dominique	6' 6" (1.98m)		2005-11-16	France	1
G	5	(Australia)	Melbourne, Jade	5' 10" (1.78m)	145 lb (66kg)	2002-08-18	Australia	3
F	33	(United States)	Samuelson, Katie Lou (injured)	6' 3" (1.91m)	163 lb (74kg)	1997-06-13	Connecticut	5
G	-	(United States)	Sherrod, Jaylyn	5' 7" (1.7m)	147 lb (67kg)	2001-10-21	Colorado	2
G/F	3	(United States)	Thierry, Taylor	6' 1" (1.85m)		2003-01-08	Ohio State	1

Head coach
(United States) Sonia Raman (Tufts)
Assistant coaches
(Canada) Natalie Achonwa (Notre Dame)
(United States) Jarell Christian (Emory & Henry)
(United States) Michael Joiner (Florida State)
Player development
(United States) Lake Joyner (Washington)
(United States) Marcus Tibbs (Bellevue College)
Athletic trainer
(United States) Laura Mancuso (Liberty)
Strength and conditioning coach
(United States) Emily Blurton (Concordia–Chicago)

Legend

- (C) Team captain
- (DP) Unsigned draft pick
- (FA) Free agent
- (S) Suspended
- Injured

WNBA roster page

East
ATL
CHI
CON
IND
NY
TOR
WAS
West
DAL
GS
LV
LA
MIN
PHO
POR
SEA

=== Depth ===
Pos.	Starter	Bench
PG	Natisha Hiedeman	Zia Cooke
SG	Jade Melbourne	Lexie Brown
SF	Flau'jae Johnson	Katie Lou Samuelson
PF	Awa Fam	Mackenzie Holmes; Jordan Horston
C	Dominique Malonga	Ezi Magbegor; Stefanie Dolson

== Schedule ==
=== Preseason ===
2026 pre-season game log
Total: 1–1 (Home: 1–0; Road: 0–1)
April: 1–1 (Home: 1–0; Road: 0–1)

Game	Date	Team	Score	High points	High rebounds	High assists	Location Attendance	Record
1	April 25	@ Golden State	L 76–78	Cooke, Johnson (12)	Dominique Malonga (5)	Taina Mair (4)	Chase Center; 18,064	0–1
2	April 29	Portland	W 91–81	Flau'jae Johnson (20)	Dominique Malonga (11)	Taina Mair (5)	Climate Pledge Arena; 8,627	1–1

2026 pre-season schedule

=== Regular season ===
2026 game log
Total: 8–35 (Home: 6–15; Road: 2–20)
May: 3–6 (Home: 2–3; Road: 1–3)

Game	Date	Team	Score	High points	High rebounds	High assists	Location Attendance	Record
1	May 8	Golden State	L 80–91	Dominque Malonga (21)	Dominque Malonga (8)	Brown, Dolson, Hiedeman, Melbourne (3)	Climate Pledge Arena; 14,200	0–1
2	May 10	@ Connecticut	W 89–82	Lexie Brown (17)	Dominque Malonga (7)	Jade Melbourne (6)	Mohegan Sun Arena; 7,374	1–1
3	May 13	@ Toronto	L 73–86	Dominique Malonga (21)	Dominique Malonga (7)	Jade Melbourne (6)	Coca-Cola Coliseum; 8,142	1–2
4	May 17	@ Indiana	L 78–89	Natisha Hiedeman (19)	Flau'jae Johnson (6)	Zia Cooke (4)	Gainbridge Fieldhouse; 14,505	1–3
5	May 20	Connecticut	L 78–80	Natisha Hiedeman (20)	Mackenzie Holmes (6)	Natisha Hiedeman (5)	Climate Pledge Arena; 9,024	1–4
6	May 22	Connecticut	W 77–59	Zia Cooke (25)	Flau'jae Johnson (7)	Natisha Hiedeman (6)	Climate Pledge Arena; 9,741	2–4
7	May 24	Washington	W 97–85	Natisha Hiedeman (24)	Flau'jae Johnson (6)	Jade Melbourne (6)	Climate Pledge Arena; 10,559	3–4
8	May 27	Washington	L 64–78	Jade Melbourne (15)	Mackenzie Holmes (10)	Horston, Melbourne (3)	Climate Pledge Arena; 9,202	3–5
9	May 30	@ Toronto	L 72–93	Natisha Hiedeman (18)	Mackenzie Holmes (7)	Natisha Hiedeman (7)	Coca-Cola Coliseum; 8,210	3–6

June : 2–9 (Home: 2–4; Road: 0–5)

Game	Date	Team	Score	High points	High rebounds	High assists	Location Attendance	Record
10	June 1	@ Dallas	L 56–79	Flau'jae Johnson (16)	Flau'jae Johnson (10)	Hiedeman, Holmes, Samuelson (2)	College Park Center; 6,251	3–7
11	June 3	Phoenix	L 68–72	Awa Fam (18)	Fam, Holmes (6)	Flau'jae Johnson (5)	Climate Pledge Arena; 9,109	3–8
12	June 6	@ Minnesota	L 68–88	Hiedeman, Melbourne (14)	Flau'jae Johnson (6)	Natisha Hiedeman (5)	Target Center; 10,801	3–9
13	June 8	@ Las Vegas	L 91–101	Dominique Malonga (19)	Jordan Horston (7)	Flau'jae Johnson (7)	Michelob Ultra Arena; 10,261	3–10
14	June 10	Los Angeles	L 83–88	Natisha Hiedeman (16)	Flau'jae Johnson (12)	Flau'jae Johnson (6)	Climate Pledge Arena; 9,309	3–11
15	June 12	Golden State	L 72–76	Natisha Hiedeman (26)	Dominique Malonga (8)	Hiedeman, Horston (5)	Climate Pledge Arena; 10,648	3–12
16	June 17	@ Portland	L 89–94	Dominique Malonga (28)	Dominique Malonga (11)	Jade Melbourne (8)	Moda Center; 13,084	3–13
17	June 20	@ Phoenix	L 73–93	Natisha Hiedeman (20)	Awa Fam (10)	Natisha Hiedeman (4)	Mortgage Matchup Center; 9,662	3–14
18	June 22	Dallas	L 110–112 (OT)	Dominique Malonga (37)	Dominique Malonga (12)	Natisha Hiedeman (11)	Climate Pledge Arena; 14,200	3–15
19	June 25	New York	W 99–88	Flau'jae Johnson (28)	Dominique Malonga (10)	Jade Melbourne (7)	Climate Pledge Arena; 11,968	4–15
20	June 27	Atlanta	W 105–90	Flau'jae Johnson (24)	Johnson, Malonga (11)	Natisha Hiedeman (6)	Climate Pledge Arena; 13,643	5–15

July : 1–10 (Home: 0–4; Road: 1–6)

Game	Date	Team	Score	High points	High rebounds	High assists	Location Attendance	Record
21	July 2	@ Phoenix	L 67–90	Fam, Hiedeman (13)	Fam, Malonga (6)	Jade Melbourne (5)	Mortgage Matchup Center; 10,055	5–16
22	July 4	Portland	L 72–77	Dominique Malonga (22)	Flau'jae Johnson (8)	Natisha Hiedeman (4)	Climate Pledge Arena; 10,251	5–17
23	July 6	@ Los Angeles	W 82–64	Flau'jae Johnson (23)	Dominique Malonga (9)	Hiedeman, Melbourne (4)	Crypto.com Arena; 12,160	6–17
24	July 9	@ Atlanta	L 78–89	Natisha Hiedeman (20)	Dominique Malonga (9)	Flau'jae Johnson (5)	Gateway Center Arena; 3,617	6–18
25	July 12	@ Washington	L 79–84	Natisha Hiedeman (31)	Dominique Malonga (15)	Hiedeman, Johnson (3)	CareFirst Arena; 4,200	6–19
26	July 15	@ Chicago	L 90–95	Flau'jae Johnson (25)	Dominique Malonga (12)	Jade Melbourne (5)	Wintrust Arena; 9,025	6–20
27	July 17	@ Indiana	L 107–110	Dominique Malonga (28)	Dominique Malonga (14)	Natisha Hiedeman (8)	Gainbridge Fieldhouse; 17,274	6–21
28	July 20	Minnesota	L 102–105	Flau'jae Johnson (26)	Awa Fam (11)	Natisha Hiedeman (10)	Climate Pledge Arena; 12,500	6–22
29	July 22	Minnesota	L 76–86	Dominique Malonga (21)	Awa Fam (10)	Johnson, Melbourne (4)	Climate Pledge Arena; 13,106	6–23
All-Star Game
30	July 28	Indiana	L 95–105	Natisha Hiedeman (33)	Dolson, Hiedeman (6)	Hiedeman, Melbourne (4)	Climate Pledge Arena; 18,343	6–24
31	July 31	@ Atlanta	L 89–98	Natisha Hiedeman (23)	Dominique Malonga (13)	Jade Melbourne (6)	Gateway Center Arena; 3,610	6–25

August : 2–7 (Home: 2–3; Road: 0–4)

Game	Date	Team	Score	High points	High rebounds	High assists	Location Attendance	Record
32	August 3	@ New York	L 83–95	Flau'jae Johnson (25)	Awa Fam (9)	Natisha Hiedeman (7)	Barclays Center; 15,312	6–26
33	August 5	@ New York	L 86–92	Dominique Malonga (31)	Dominique Malonga (10)	Jade Melbourne (7)	Barclays Center; 16,971	6–27
34	August 8	@ Portland	L 93–100	Jade Melbourne (23)	Dominique Malonga (9)	Ezi Magbegor (6)	Moda Center; 15,294	6–28
35	August 10	Chicago	W 97–88	Dominique Malonga (26)	Dominique Malonga (10)	Natisha Hiedeman (9)	Climate Pledge Arena; 11,655	7–28
36	August 14	Portland	L 82–84	Awa Fam (20)	Dominique Malonga (12)	Hiedeman, Malonga (5)	Climate Pledge Arena; 12,596	7–29
37	August 16	Chicago	L 80–82	Dominique Malonga (19)	Dominique Malonga (13)	Johnson, Melbourne (6)	Climate Pledge Arena; 12,916	7–30
38	August 23	@ Dallas	L 70–92	Flau'jae Johnson (23)	Fam, Johnson (6)	Cooke, Magbegor (3)	College Park Center; 6,251	7–31
39	August 26	Toronto	W 90–78	Flau'jae Johnson (20)	Dominique Malonga (7)	Jade Melbourne (7)	Climate Pledge Arena; 11,558	8–31
40	August 30	Los Angeles	L 74–90	Flau'jae Johnson (19)	Dominique Malonga (15)	Dolson, Malonga, Melbourne (3)	Climate Pledge Arena; 14,200	8–32

September : 0–4 (Home: 0–2; Road: 0–2)

Game	Date	Team	Score	High points	High rebounds	High assists	Location Attendance	Record
41	September 17	Las Vegas	L 77–114	Flau'jae Johnson (25)	Awa Fam (9)	Natisha Hiedeman (7)	Climate Pledge Arena; 14,200	8–33
42	September 19	@ Golden State	L 57–70	Flau'jae Johnson (17)	Awa Fam (9)	Natisha Hiedeman (3)	Chase Center; 18,064	8–34
43	September 20	@ Las Vegas	L 77–98	Flau'jae Johnson (29)	Dominique Malonga (8)	Flau'jae Johnson (6)	Michelob Ultra Arena; 10,263	8–35
44	September 23	Dallas	L 91–103	Dominique Malonga (29)	Dominique Malonga (8)	Natisha Hiedeman (14)	Climate Pledge Arena; 14,200	8–36

2026 season schedule

Notes:

- Games highlighted in represent Commissioner's Cup games.

== Standings ==
#	Team	W	L	PCT	GB	Conf.	Home	Road	Cup
1	y — Minnesota Lynx	33	11	.750	–	20–3	15–7	18–4	6–1
2	x — Golden State Valkyries	32	12	.727	1	15–8	17–5	15–7	5–2
3	x — Las Vegas Aces	31	13	.705	2	17–6	15–7	16–6	6–1
4	x — Atlanta Dream	30	14	.682	3	15–5	15–7	15–7	4–2
5	x — Washington Mystics	28	16	.636	5	15–5	15–7	13–9	3–3
6	x — Indiana Fever	28	16	.636	5	14–6	15–7	13–9	5–1
7	x — Dallas Wings	27	17	.614	6	13–10	16–6	11–11	4–3
8	cx – New York Liberty	26	18	.591	7	13–7	14–8	12–10	6–0
9	e — Portland Fire	17	27	.386	16	7–16	9–13	8–14	2–5
10	e — Phoenix Mercury	16	28	.364	17	10–13	7–15	9–13	2–5
11	e — Chicago Sky	16	28	.364	17	4–16	11–11	5–17	1–5
12	e — Los Angeles Sparks	16	28	.364	17	9–14	8–14	8–14	3–4
13	e — Toronto Tempo	11	33	.250	22	5–15	7–15	4–18	2–4
14	e — Connecticut Sun	11	33	.250	22	4–16	8–14	3–19	0–6
15	e — Seattle Storm	8	36	.182	25	1–22	6–16	2–20	0–7

Notes

(#) – League Standing
c – Commissioner's Cup winner
y – Regular season champion
x – Clinched playoff berth
e – Eliminated from playoff contention
Source: Overall standings and Commissioner's Cup Standings
