= 2026 New York Liberty season =

- Head coach: Chris DeMarco
- Arena: Barclays Center

Results
- Record: 26–18 (.591)
- Place: 4th (Eastern)
- Playoff finish: 8th seed Lost in Semifinals 0–3 to Atlanta Dream

Media
- Television: WWOR-TV; WNYW

The 2026 New York Liberty season was the 30th season for the New York Liberty franchise of the WNBA, and their first season under head coach Chris DeMarco. The team advanced to the 2026 WNBA Commissioner's Cup championship game after leading the Eastern Conference with an undefeated 6–0 record. They defeated the Las Vegas Aces to win their first Commissioner's Cup championship since 2023.

The Liberty qualified for the 2026 WNBA playoffs as the eighth seed. They upset the first-seeded Minnesota Lynx in the first round, becoming the first eighth-seeded team to do so. However, they were swept by the Atlanta Dream in the semifinals.

== Draft ==
Round	Pick	Player	Position	Nationality	Club	Outcome	Ref.
3	41	Manuela Puoch	Forward	Australia	Southside Flyers		

== Transactions ==
=== Front office and coaching ===
Date	Details	Ref.
September 23, 2025	Announced that Head Coach Sandy Brondello's contract will not be renewed for the 2026 season	
December 3, 2025	Hired Chris DeMarco as head coach	
April 1, 2026	Courtney Paris, Addi Walters, Will Sheehey announced as assistant coaches; Andrew Wade announced as assistant coach and director of player development	

=== Free agency ===
==== Core designation ====
Player	Date	Notes	Ref.
Sabrina Ionescu	April 7	Accepted April 17	

==== Re-signed / extensions ====
Player	Date	Notes	Ref.
Rebekah Gardner	April 15	One-year deal (Note: Unprotected / training camp contract)	
Betnijah Laney-Hamilton	April 17	One-year deal	
Breanna Stewart	April 17	Three-year deal	
Sabrina Ionescu	April 17	Three-year deal	
Jonquel Jones	April 19	Three-year deal	
Marine Johannès	April 28	One-year deal	

==== Additions ====
Player	Date	Notes	Former Team	Ref.
Raquel Carrera	April 12	One-year deal	Valencia Basket (Spain)	
Anneli Maley	April 12	Training camp contract	Perth Lynx (Australia)	
Anneli Maley	May 23	Developmental contract	Phoenix Mercury	
Anneli Maley	September 3	One-year deal	Phoenix Mercury	
Pauline Astier	April 13	Rookie contract	USK Praha (Prague)	
Rebecca Allen	April 13	One-year deal	Chicago Sky	
Alex Fowler	April 15	Rookie contract	Jiangsu Nanjian	
Alex Fowler	May 14	Developmental contract	Jiangsu Nanjian	
Satou Sabally	April 17	Two-year deal	Phoenix Mercury	
Han Xu	April 18	One-year deal	Perth Lynx (Australia)	
Marine Fauthoux	April 18	Developmental contract (Note: 2021 Liberty draft pick (No. 29))	Çukurova Basketbol (Turkey)	
Marine Fauthoux	August 6	Two-year deal	Çukurova Basketbol (Turkey)	
Aubrey Griffin	May 8	Hardship contract	Minnesota Lynx	
Julia Vanloo	May 8	Hardship contract	Los Angeles Sparks	
Elizabeth Balogun	August 18	Developmental contract	Landerneau (France)	
Madison Scott	September 2	Developmental contract	Geas Basket (Italy)	

==== Subtractions ====
Player	Date	Reason	New Team	Ref.
Nyara Sabally	April 6	Expansion draft	Toronto Tempo	
Adja Kane	April 6	Expansion draft	Toronto Tempo	
Kennedy Burke	April 12	Free agency	Connecticut Sun	
Isabelle Harrison	April 12	Free agency	Toronto Tempo	
Stephanie Talbot	April 12	Free agency	Las Vegas Aces	
Natasha Cloud	May 4	Free agency	Chicago Sky	
Aubrey Griffin	May 19	Waived		
Julie Vanloo	May 22	Waived		
Alex Fowler	May 22	Released		
Betnijah Laney-Hamilton	August 6	Waived	Washington Mystics	

=== Other transactions ===
Unsigned
Player	Date	Notes	Ref.
Ivana Dojkić	April 5	Rights renounced	
Seehia Ridard	April 5	Rights renounced	
Seehia Ridard	May 6	Rights retained	
Annika Soltau	April 5	Rights renounced	
Annika Soltau	May 7	Rights retained	
Manuela Puoch	April 13	Unsigned draft pick (2026 draft pick – No. 41)	
DiDi Richards	April 14	Training camp contract	
DiDi Richards	May 6	Waived, did not appear at camp (injury)	

Other training camp attendees
Player	Date	Notes	Ref.
Anneli Maley	April 12 – May 6	Training camp contract, waived, and awarded on waivers to the Phoenix Mercury	
Anneli Maley	May 23	Developmental contract	
Alex Fowler	April 15 – May 6	Rookie scale contract, waived from camp	
Alex Fowler	May 14 – May 22	Developmental contract, released	
Ugonne Onyiah	April 15 – May 7	Rookie scale contract, waived from camp	
Derin Erdogan	April 15 – May 6	Rookie scale contract, waived from camp	
Ny'Ceara Pryor	April 15 – April 30	Rookie scale contract, waived from camp	
Ashley Owusu	April 15 – April 30	Training camp contract, waived from camp	

== Roster ==
New York Liberty roster
Players
Coaches

Pos.	No.	Nat.	Name	Height	Weight	DOB	From	Yrs
G/F	9	(Australia)	Allen, Rebecca	6' 2" (1.88m)	162 lb (73kg)	1992-11-06	Carey	9
G	18	(France)	Astier, Pauline	5' 10" (1.78m)		2002-02-15	France	R
F	5	(Nigeria)	Balogun, Elizabeth	6' 2" (1.88m)	183 lb (83kg)	2000-09-09	Duke	R
F/C	14	(Spain)	Carrera, Raquel	6' 3" (1.91m)		2001-10-31	Spain	R
G	4	(France)	Fauthoux, Marine	5' 9" (1.75m)		2001-01-23	France	R
F	13	(Germany)	Fiebich, Leonie (injured)	6' 4" (1.93m)		2000-01-10	Johann-Winklhofer	2
G	7	(United States)	Gardner, Rebekah	6' 1" (1.85m)	130 lb (59kg)	1990-07-09	UCLA	2
G	20	(United States)	Ionescu, Sabrina	5' 11" (1.8m)	165 lb (75kg)	1997-12-06	Oregon	5
G	23	(France)	Johannès, Marine	5' 10" (1.78m)	134 lb (61kg)	1995-01-21	France	3
C	35	(The Bahamas)	Jones, Jonquel	6' 6" (1.98m)	215 lb (98kg)	1994-01-05	George Washington	8
F	24	(Australia)	Maley, Anneli	6' 1" (1.85m)		1998-09-01	TCU	2
F	0	(Germany)	Sabally, Satou (injured)	6' 4" (1.93m)	175 lb (79kg)	1998-04-25	Oregon	5
G/F	10	(United States)	Scott, Madison	6' 2" (1.88m)		2001-12-27	Mississippi	1
F	30	(United States)	Stewart, Breanna	6' 4" (1.93m)	170 lb (77kg)	1994-08-27	Connecticut	8
C	21	(China)	Han Xu	6' 11" (2.11m)	203 lb (92kg)	1999-10-31	China	3

Assistant coaches
(United States) Courtney Paris (Oklahoma)
(United States) Will Sheehey (Indiana)
(United States) Andrew Wade (Catholic)
(United States) Addi Walters (Stetson)
Athletic trainer
(United States) Norielis Subero

Legend

- (C) Team captain
- (DP) Unsigned draft pick
- (FA) Free agent
- (S) Suspended
- Injured

WNBA roster page

East
ATL
CHI
CON
IND
NY
TOR
WAS
West
DAL
GS
LV
LA
MIN
PHO
POR
SEA

=== Depth chart ===
Pos.	Starter	Bench
PG	Pauline Astier	Marine Johannès; Marine Fauthoux
SG	Sabrina Ionescu	Rebekah Gardner
SF	Leonie Fiebich	Rebecca Allen; Anneli Maley
PF	Breanna Stewart	Raquel Carrera
C	Jonquel Jones	Han Xu

== Schedule ==
=== Preseason ===
2026 pre-season game log
Total: 1–1 (Home: 0–1; Road: 1–0)
April / May: 1–1 (Home: 0–1; Road: 1–0)

Game	Date	Team	Score	High points	High rebounds	High assists	Location Attendance	Record
1	April 25	Indiana	L 91–109	Han Xu (20)	Anneli Maley (7)	Ny'Ceara Pryor (5)	Barclays Center; 14.662	0–1
2	May 3	@ Connecticut	W 79–67	Jonquel Jones (15)	Rebekah Gardner (7)	Astier, Johannès (4)	Mohegan Sun Arena; 5.218	1–1

2026 pre-season schedule

=== Regular season ===
2026 game log
Total: 26–18 (Home: 14–8; Road: 12–10)
May: 5–4 (Home: 3–3; Road: 2–1)

Game	Date	Team	Score	High points	High rebounds	High assists	Location Attendance	Record
1	May 8	Connecticut	W 106–75	Breanna Stewart (31)	Breanna Stewart (10)	Julie Vanloo (11)	Barclays Center; 17,615	1–0
2	May 10	@ Washington	W 98–93 (OT)	Marine Johannès (25)	Breanna Stewart (9)	Pauline Astier (7)	CareFirst Arena; 4,200	2–0
3	May 12	@ Portland	L 96–98	Pauline Astier (24)	Breanna Stewart (10)	Gardner, Johannès, Stewart (4)	Moda Center; 12,386	2–1
4	May 14	@ Portland	W 100–82	Breanna Stewart (22)	Jonquel Jones (9)	Marine Johannès (11)	Moda Center; 13,087	3–1
5	May 21	Golden State	L 70–87	Breanna Stewart (18)	Breanna Stewart (9)	Julie Vanloo (8)	Barclays Center; 15,862	3–2
6	May 24	Dallas	L 76–91	Satou Sabally (20)	Breanna Stewart (11)	Sabrina Ionescu (7)	Barclays Center; 17,622	3–3
7	May 25	Portland	L 74–81	Breanna Stewart (25)	Jonquel Jones (11)	Marine Johannès (6)	Barclays Center; 13,881	3–4
8	May 27	Phoenix	W 84–74	Marine Johannès (21)	Jonquel Jones (12)	Marine Johannès (5)	Barclays Center; 14,995	4–4
9	May 29	Phoenix	W 75–68	Pauline Astier (16)	Jonquel Jones (9)	Pauline Astier (6)	Barclays Center; 17,579	5–4

June : 7–4 (Home: 3–1; Road: 4–3)

Game	Date	Team	Score	High points	High rebounds	High assists	Location Attendance	Record
10	June 3	Toronto	W 97–82	Jonquel Jones (22)	Jonquel Jones (17)	Pauline Astier (5)	Barclays Center; 14,574	6–4
11	June 6	Indiana	W 83–75	Breanna Stewart (30)	Jonquel Jones (12)	Jonquel Jones (4)	Barclays Center; 16,306	7–4
12	June 8	@ Connecticut	W 89–80	Breanna Stewart (28)	Breanna Stewart (9)	Pauline Astier (4)	Gateway Center Arena	8–4
13	June 11	@ Atlanta	W 104–90	Sabally, Stewart (19)	Breanna Stewart (11)	Astier, Jones, Stewart (5)	Mohegan Sun Arena; 3,600	9–4
14	June 14	Washington	W 86–64	Jonquel Jones (20)	Breanna Stewart (12)	Astier, Sabally (6)	Barclays Center; 17,581	10–4
15	June 17	@ Chicago	W 96–95	Jonquel Jones (19)	Jonquel Jones (8)	Pauline Astier (4)	Wintrust Arena; 7,225	11–4
16	June 19	Washington	L 83–86	Leonie Fiebich (19)	Jones, Stewart (10)	Breanna Stewart (6)	Barclays Center; 16,539	11–5
17	June 21	@ Los Angeles	L 97–98	Jones, Stewart (18)	Breanna Stewart (10)	Satou Sabally (7)	Crypto.com Arena; 18,043	11–6
18	June 23	@ Las Vegas	W 87–76	Breanna Stewart (20)	Sabrina Ionescu (10)	Ionescu, Stewart (4)	Michelob Ultra Arena; 10,274	12–6
19	June 25	@ Seattle	L 88–99	Jonquel Jones (26)	Jonquel Jones (8)	Astier, Ionescu (5)	Climate Pledge Arena; 11,968	12–7
20	June 28	@ Golden State	L 67–76	Jonquel Jones (21)	Jonquel Jones (7)	Pauline Astier (4)	Chase Center; 18,064	12–8

July : 4–5 (Home: 2–1; Road: 2–4)

Game	Date	Team	Score	High points	High rebounds	High assists	Location Attendance	Record
21	July 3	Minnesota	W 99–86	Breanna Stewart (36)	Jonquel Jones (15)	Astier, Ionescu (6)	Barclays Center; 15,345	13–8
22	July 7	Dallas	L 77–88	Breanna Stewart (29)	Jonquel Jones (12)	Sabrina Ionescu (5)	Barclays Center; 17,532	13–9
23	July 11	@ Minnesota	L 85–90	Sabrina Ionescu (25)	Jonquel Jones (12)	Sabrina Ionescu (5)	Target Center; 12,405	13–10
24	July 12	@ Toronto	L 91–93	Sabrina Ionescu (28)	Jonquel Jones (10)	Sabrina Ionescu (8)	Bell Centre; 12,724	13–11
25	July 16	@ Dallas	Postponed to July 20 due to mechanical issues with New York's charter plane				College Park Center	
26	July 18	@ Indiana	L 88–108	Breanna Stewart (26)	Breanna Stewart (8)	Pauline Astier (5)	Gainbridge Fieldhouse; 17,274	13–12
27	July 20	@ Dallas	W 99–98 (OT)	Breanna Stewart (33)	Breanna Stewart (13)	Breanna Stewart (8)	College Park Center; 6,251	14–12
28	July 22	Chicago	W 95–94	Sabrina Ionescu (29)	Jonquel Jones (10)	Pauline Astier (5)	Barclays Center; 16,783	15–12
All-Star Game
29	July 28	@ Los Angeles	W 113–109	Breanna Stewart (29)	Sabrina Ionescu (7)	Breanna Stewart (7)	Crypto.com Arena; 15,499	16–12
30	July 30	@ Las Vegas	L 99–104	Breanna Stewart (26)	Breanna Stewart (11)	Ionescu, Jones (5)	Michelob Ultra Arena; 10,500	16–13

August : 8–3 (Home: 6–1; Road: 2–2)

Game	Date	Team	Score	High points	High rebounds	High assists	Location Attendance	Record
31	August 1	@ Phoenix	W 94–92	Sabrina Ionescu (27)	Breanna Stewart (11)	Sabrina Ionescu (10)	Mortgage Matchup Center; 10,097	17–13
32	August 3	Seattle	W 95–83	Breanna Stewart (24)	Breanna Stewart (8)	Breanna Stewart (6)	Barclays Center; 15,312	18–13
33	August 5	Seattle	W 92–86	Breanna Stewart (28)	Jonquel Jones (15)	Jonquel Jones (7)	Barclays Center; 16,971	19–13
34	August 9	Las Vegas	W 111–71	Marine Johannès (27)	Allen, Jones (8)	Marine Fauthoux (9)	Barclays Center; 17,082	20–13
35	August 11	@ Indiana	L 92–106	Ionescu, Stewart (19)	Jonquel Jones (10)	Ionescu, Stewart (5)	Gainbridge Fieldhouse; 16,507	20–14
36	August 13	Los Angeles	W 85–81	Sabrina Ionescu (20)	Jonquel Jones (18)	Astier, Stewart (5)	Barclays Center; 16,071	21–14
37	August 15	@ Connecticut	W 82–75	Jonquel Jones (23)	Jonquel Jones (11)	Marine Johannès (5)	Mohegan Sun Arena; 8,911	22–14
38	August 18	@ Chicago	L 86–93	Breanna Stewart (22)	Han, Ionescu, Stewart (7)	Sabrina Ionescu (12)	Wintrust Arena; 7,099	22–15
39	August 22	Indiana	W 109–102	Breanna Stewart (22)	Jonquel Jones (10)	Breanna Stewart (7)	Barclays Center; 17,581	23–15
40	August 27	Golden State	L 60–79	Jonquel Jones (18)	Jonquel Jones (7)	Sabrina Ionescu (4)	Barclays Center; 17,579	23–16
41	August 29	Chicago	W 85–66	Han Xu (19)	Breanna Stewart (9)	Sabrina Ionescu (4)	Barclays Center; 17,107	24–16

September : 2–2 (Home: 0–2; Road: 2–0)

Game	Date	Team	Score	High points	High rebounds	High assists	Location Attendance	Record
42	September 18	@ Minnesota	W 93–81	Breanna Stewart (24)	Jones, Stewart (10)	Sabrina Ionescu (6)	Target Center; 15,710	25–16
43	September 20	@ Toronto	W 106–69	Breanna Stewart (27)	Pauline Astier (9)	Sabrina Ionescu (9)	Coca-Cola Coliseum; 8,210	26–16
44	September 21	Atlanta	L 84–95	Breanna Stewart (27)	Breanna Stewart (14)	Leonie Fiebich (6)	Barclays Center; 16,458	26–17
45	September 23	Atlanta	L 63–85	Marine Fauthoux (14)	Jonquel Jones (14)	Carrera, Fauthoux (4)	Barclays Center; 17,581	26–18

2026 season schedule

Notes:

- Games highlighted in represent Commissioner's Cup games.

=== Playoffs ===
2026 playoff game log
First round vs. Minnesota Lynx
Won Series 2–0

Game	Date	Team	Score	High points	High rebounds	High assists	Location Attendance	Series
1	September 27	@ Minnesota	W 91–75	Breanna Stewart (34)	Breanna Stewart (12)	Ionescu, Stewart (6)	Target Center; 12,339	1–0
2	September 29	Minnesota	W 87–71	Jones, Stewart (21)	Jonquel Jones (13)	Sabrina Ionescu (7)	Barclays Center; 17,593	2–0

Semifinals vs. Atlanta Dream
Lost Series 0–3

Game	Date	Team	Score	High points	High rebounds	High assists	Location Attendance	Series
1	October 4	@ Atlanta	L 82–92	Sabrina Ionescu (27)	Jonquel Jones (11)	Jonquel Jones (4)	State Farm Arena; 9,745	0–1
2	October 7	@ Atlanta	L 98–101 (OT)	Breanna Stewart (35)	Breanna Stewart (11)	Sabrina Ionescu (7)	State Farm Arena; 9,574	0–2
3	October 9	Atlanta	L 83–85	Jones, Stewart (26)	Jonquel Jones (14)	Breanna Stewart (6)	Barclays Center; 17,991	0–3

2026 playoff schedule

== Standings ==
#	Team	W	L	PCT	GB	Conf.	Home	Road	Cup
1	y — Minnesota Lynx	33	11	.750	–	20–3	15–7	18–4	6–1
2	x — Golden State Valkyries	32	12	.727	1	15–8	17–5	15–7	5–2
3	x — Las Vegas Aces	31	13	.705	2	17–6	15–7	16–6	6–1
4	x — Atlanta Dream	30	14	.682	3	15–5	15–7	15–7	4–2
5	x — Washington Mystics	28	16	.636	5	15–5	15–7	13–9	3–3
6	x — Indiana Fever	28	16	.636	5	14–6	15–7	13–9	5–1
7	x — Dallas Wings	27	17	.614	6	13–10	16–6	11–11	4–3
8	cx – New York Liberty	26	18	.591	7	13–7	14–8	12–10	6–0
9	e — Portland Fire	17	27	.386	16	7–16	9–13	8–14	2–5
10	e — Phoenix Mercury	16	28	.364	17	10–13	7–15	9–13	2–5
11	e — Chicago Sky	16	28	.364	17	4–16	11–11	5–17	1–5
12	e — Los Angeles Sparks	16	28	.364	17	9–14	8–14	8–14	3–4
13	e — Toronto Tempo	11	33	.250	22	5–15	7–15	4–18	2–4
14	e — Connecticut Sun	11	33	.250	22	4–16	8–14	3–19	0–6
15	e — Seattle Storm	8	36	.182	25	1–22	6–16	2–20	0–7

Notes

(#) – League Standing
c – Commissioner's Cup winner
y – Regular season champion
x – Clinched playoff berth
e – Eliminated from playoff contention
Source: Overall standings and Commissioner's Cup Standings

== Playoffs ==
**First round** Best-of-3
1	Minnesota Lynx	0
8	**New York Liberty**	**2**
4	**Atlanta Dream**	**2**
5	Washington Mystics	0
2	**Golden State Valkyries**	**2**
7	Dallas Wings	1
3	**Las Vegas Aces**	**2**
6	Indiana Fever	1

**Semifinals**; Best-of-5
8	New York Liberty	0
4	**Atlanta Dream**	**3**
2	**Golden State Valkyries**	**3**
3	Las Vegas Aces	0

**Finals**; Best-of-7
4	Atlanta Dream	3
2	**Golden State Valkyries**	**4**

- **Bold** – Series winner
- Italic – Team with home-court-advantage
