= Han Xu (basketball) =

Chinese basketball player (born 1999)

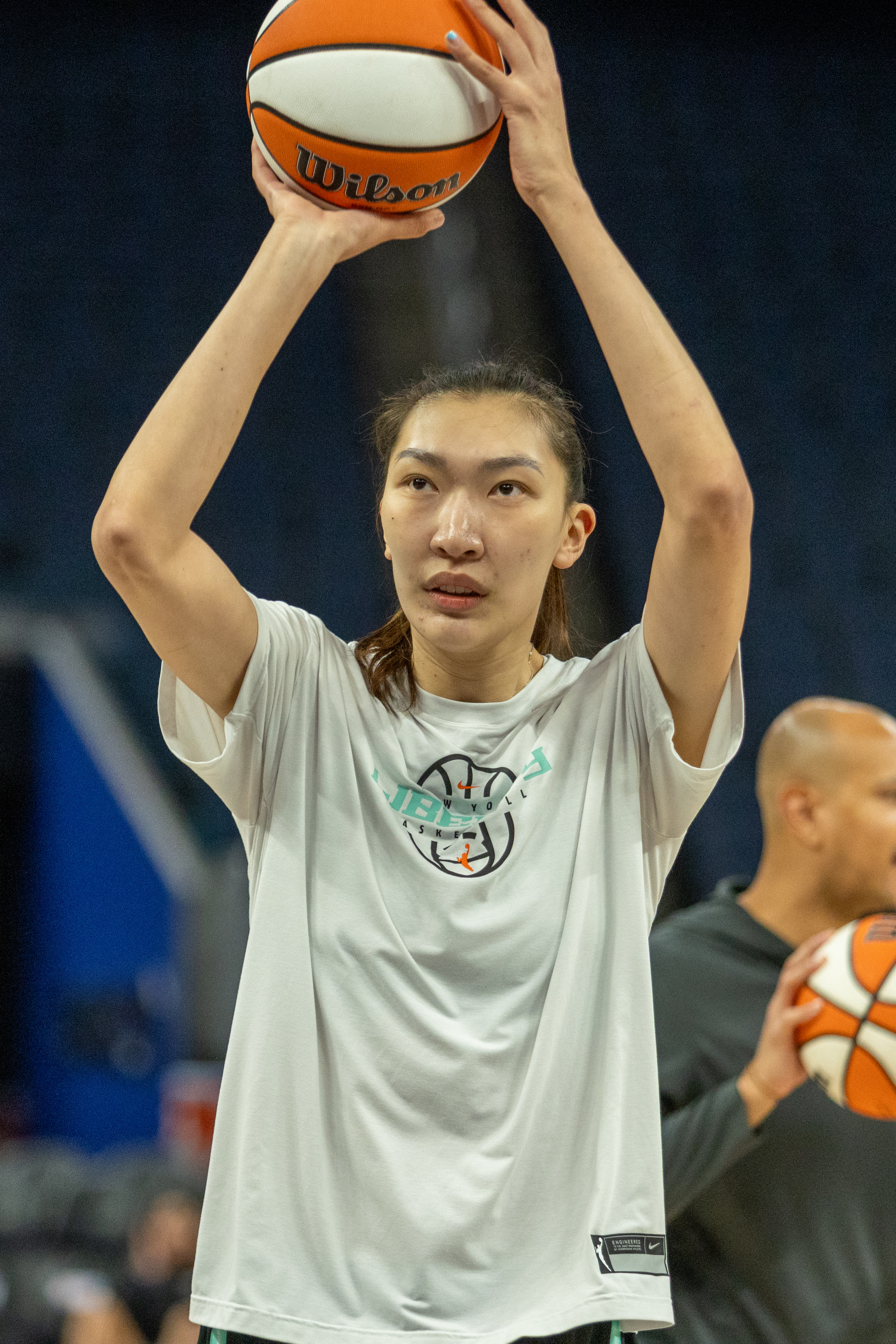
- Han with the New York Liberty in 2026

No. 21 – Geelong Venom
- Position: Center
- League: WNBL

Personal information
- Born: 31 October 1999 (age 27) Shijiazhuang, Hebei, China
- Listed height: 6 ft 11 in (2.11 m)
- Listed weight: 203 lb (92 kg)

Career information
- WNBA draft: 2019: 2nd round, 14th overall pick
- Drafted by: New York Liberty
- Playing career: 2018–present

Career history
- 2018–2021: Xinjiang Magic Deer
- 2019: New York Liberty
- 2021–2025: Sichuan JinQiang Chengdu / Yuanda Meile
- 2022–2023: New York Liberty
- 2025–2026: Perth Lynx
- 2026: New York Liberty
- 2026–present: Geelong Venom

Career highlights
- 2× WNBA Commissioner's Cup winner (2023, 2026); 2× WCBA champion (2023, 2024); WCBA Finals MVP (2023); 3× WCBA MVP (2022, 2024, 2025); 3× WCBA block leader (2019, 2021, 2022); WCBA scoring leader (2021); 5× WCBA All-Star (2019, 2021, 2023, 2024, 2025); WCBA All-Star MVP (2024); WCBA Rookie of the Year (2019); All-WNBL Second Team (2026); WNBL Defensive Player of the Year (2026)
- Stats at Basketball Reference
Medals
Women's basketball
Representing China
World Cup
Silver medal – second place	2022 Australia
Asia Cup
Silver medal – second place	2021 Jordan
Gold medal – first place	2023 Australia
Bronze medal – third place	2025 China
Asian Games
Gold medal – first place	2022 Hangzhou	Team
Summer World University Games
Gold medal – first place	2021 Chengdu

Han Xu
- Traditional Chinese: 韓旭
- Simplified Chinese: 韩旭
Transcriptions
Standard Mandarin
- Hanyu Pinyin: Hán xù

Han Xu (simplified Chinese: 韩旭; traditional Chinese: 韓旭; pinyin: Hán Xù; born 31 October 1999) is a Chinese professional basketball player for the Geelong Venom of the Women's National Basketball League (WNBL). Han was drafted with the 14th overall pick in the 2019 WNBA draft. She represents the China women's national basketball team.

== Early life ==
Han was born in Shijiazhuang, Hebei, China.

== Professional career ==
=== WCBA ===
Han played three seasons for the Xinjiang Magic Deer in the Women's Chinese Basketball Association (WCBA) between 2018 and 2021. She then played for the Sichuan JinQiang Chengdu / Yuanda Meile between 2021 and 2025. She was named WCBA MVP in 2021 and 2022.

=== WNBA ===
Han was drafted by the New York Liberty with the 14th overall pick in the 2019 WNBA draft. She was the youngest player in her draft class. In her rookie season, she was the tallest player in the league and the second-tallest player in league history, behind Margo Dydek. She drew comparisons to male Chinese international basketball player Yao Ming.

In May 2020, it was announced that Han would sit out the 2020 WNBA season to remain in China due to the COVID-19 pandemic. After sitting out the 2021 WNBA season as well, she returned to the Liberty for both the 2022 and 2023 seasons.

In April 2026, Han re-joined the New York Liberty for training camp ahead of the 2026 WNBA season.

=== WNBL ===
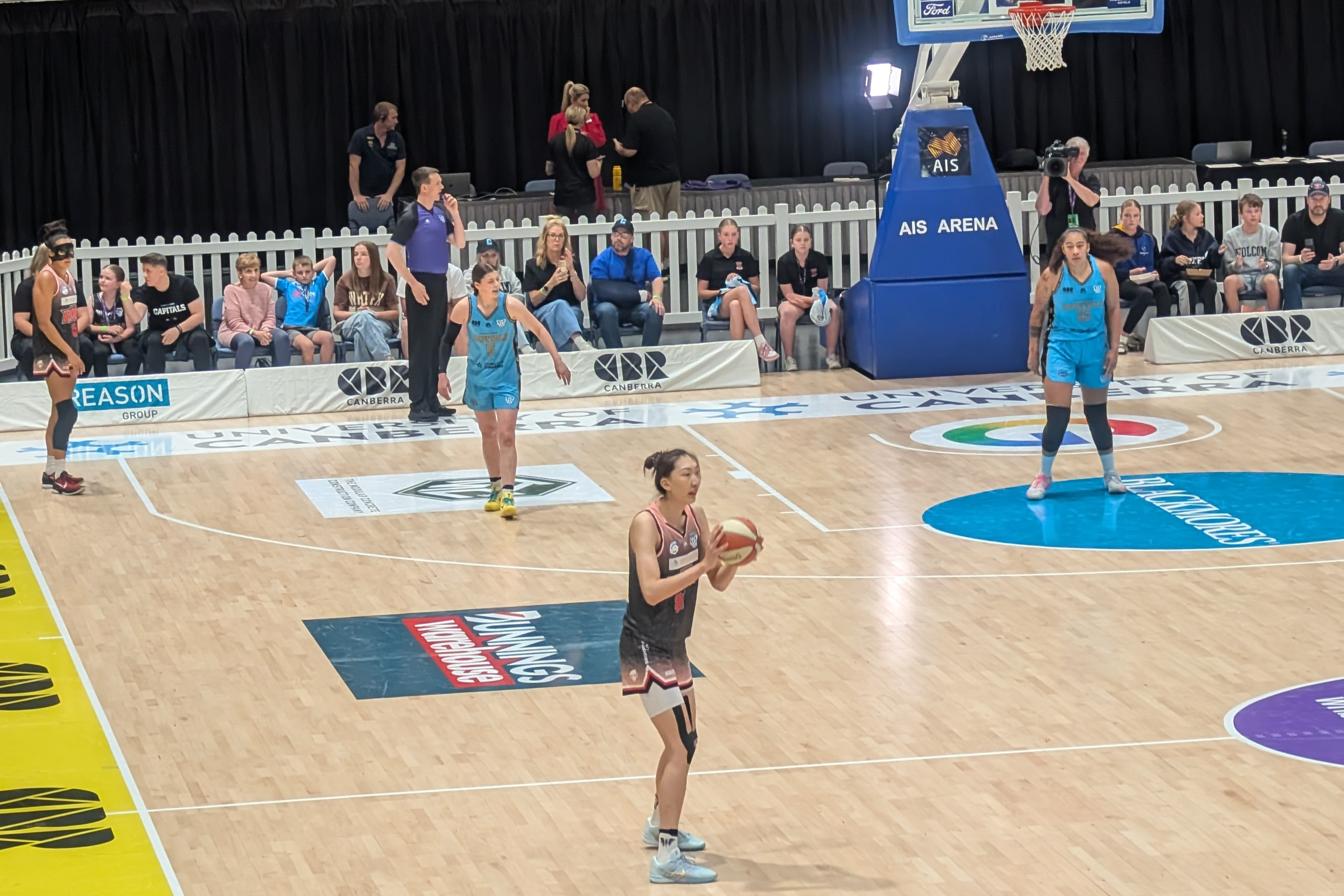
Han Xu in November 2025 during her WNBL debut with the Perth Lynx

On 11 October 2025, Han signed with the Perth Lynx of the Women's National Basketball League (WNBL) in Australia for the 2025–26 season. She was unavailable for the start of the season due to commitments in China, joining the team in late November. She was named the WNBL Defensive Player of the Year after averaging two blocks per game and leading the Lynx to a 12–2 record in her 14 games. She was also named to the All-WNBL Second Team. In the semi-finals, the Lynx defeated the Bendigo Spirit 2–0 to advance to the WNBL Grand Final, with Han recording 25 points, 14 rebounds and four blocks in game two. In the grand final series, the Lynx lost 2–0 to the Townsville Fire to finish as runners-up. Han had 16 points in game one and 18 points in game two.

On 28 July 2026, Han signed with the Geelong Venom for the 2026–27 WNBL season. On 21 November 2026, she recorded 38 points and nine rebounds in an 85–75 win over the Southside Melbourne Flyers.

== National team career ==
Han represented China at the 2016 FIBA Under-17 World Championship for Women, 2017 FIBA Under-19 Women's Basketball World Cup, 2018 FIBA Women's Basketball World Cup and 2022 FIBA Women's Basketball World Cup. She was selected to the All-Star Five at the 2022 World Cup. She averaged 12.4 points, 8.4 rebounds and 1.7 blocks per game, helping China win the silver medal. In the semi-final game against Australia, Han had a career high for China and equalled the FIBA Women's Basketball World Cup blocks record with five. She also accumulated an efficiency score of 33 after registering 19 points from 80 percent floor shooting and completing a double-double with 11 rebounds. At the 2023 FIBA Women's Asia Cup, she was named tournament MVP.

== Player profile ==
At 211 cm tall, Han was noted as being the second tallest female basketballer in the world as of November 2025.

== Career statistics ==
Legend
GP	Games played	GS	Games started	MPG	Minutes per game	RPG	Rebounds per game
APG	Assists per game	SPG	Steals per game	BPG	Blocks per game	PPG	Points per game
TO	Turnovers per game	FG%	Field-goal percentage	3P%	3-point field-goal percentage	FT%	Free-throw percentage
**Bold**	Career best	°	League leader

=== WNBA ===
==== Regular season ====
Year	Team	GP	GS	MPG	FG%	3P%	FT%	RPG	APG	SPG	BPG	TO	PPG
2019	New York	18	0	7.9	.414	**.500**	.500	.8	.1	.2	.2	**.1**	3.0
2022	New York	32	0	**16.8**	.493	.444	.796	**3.6**	**.9**	**.5**	**.7**	.7	**8.5**
2023	New York	8	0	4.5	.300	.000	—	.9	.0	.3	.1	.6	1.5
2026	New York	**44**°	**2**	13.7	**.500**	.391	**.861**	2.5	.7	.3	.6	.5	6.3
Career	4 years, 1 team	102	2	12.9	.479	.393	.816	2.4	.6	.3	.5	.5	6.0

==== Playoffs ====
Year	Team	GP	GS	MPG	FG%	3P%	FT%	RPG	APG	SPG	BPG	TO	PPG
2022	New York	3	0	**10.0**	.417	**1.000**	.833	**2.7**	**.3**	.0	.7	**.7**	**5.3**
2026	New York	**5**	0	8.2	**.455**	.571	**1.000**	1.4	.2	**.2**	**.8**	.8	3.2
Career	2 years, 1 team	8	0	8.9	.435	.625	.875	1.9	.3	.1	.8	.8	4.0

=== WCBA ===
==== Regular season ====
Year	Team	GP	GS	MPG	FG%	3P%	FT%	RPG	APG	SPG	BPG	TO	PPG
2018–2019	Xinjiang	34	34	**30.0**	.540	.333	.776	**8.9**	1.0	.9	**2.1**	**1.3**	15.9
2019–2020	Xinjiang	16	13	28.3	.540	.308	**.957**	**8.9**	1.4	**1.4**	1.9	1.4	13.4
2023–2024	Sichuan	**39**	**39**	—	**.626**	**.392**	.846	6.4	**2.1**	.5	.0	1.4	**16.0**
Career		89	86	29.5	.540	.312	.811	7.8	1.6	.8	2.0	1.1	15.5

==== Post-season ====
Year	Team	GP	GS	MPG	FG%	3P%	FT%	RPG	APG	SPG	BPG	TO	PPG
2019	Xinjiang	4	4	38.7	.485	.000	.857	7.8	.8	1.0	.5	3.5	17.5
Career		4	4	38.7	.485	.000	.857	7.8	.8	1.0	.5	3.5	17.5
