= 2026 Phoenix Mercury season =

- Head coach: Nate Tibbetts
- Arena: Mortgage Matchup Center

Results
- Record: 16–28 (.364)
- Place: 7th (Western)
- Playoff finish: Did not qualify

The 2026 Phoenix Mercury season was the 29th season for the Phoenix Mercury of the Women's National Basketball Association and the third under head coach Nate Tibbetts.

== Draft ==
The draft was held on April 13, 2026, at 7:30 pm EDT, and broadcast on ESPN.

| Round | Pick | Player | Position | Nationality | College/Club | Outcome | Ref. |
|---|---|---|---|---|---|---|---|
| 2 | 27 | Inès Pitarch-Granel | F | France | Tango Bourges (France) | | |
| 3 | 42 | Eszter Rátkai | | Hungary | PEAC (Hungary) | | |

== Transactions ==
=== Front office and coaching ===
| Date | Details | Ref. |

== Roster ==
Phoenix Mercury roster
Players
Coaches

| Pos. | No. | Nat. | Name | Height | Weight | DOB | From | Yrs |
|---|---|---|---|---|---|---|---|---|
| F | 11 | (France) | Ayayi, Valériane | 6' 1" (1.85m) | | 1994-04-29 | France | 1 |
| G/F | 1 | (France) | Brochant, Noémie | 5' 11" (1.8m) | | 1999-10-25 | France | R |
| G | 5 | (United States) | Ciezki, Shay | 5' 7" (1.7m) | | 2003-11-26 | Indiana | R |
| G/F | 2 | (United States) | Copper, Kahleah | 6' 1" (1.85m) | 165 lb (75kg) | 1994-08-28 | Rutgers | 9 |
| G | 12 | (United States) | Dunn, Kara | 5' 11" (1.8m) | | 2003-12-06 | USC | R |
| G | 10 | (United States) | Held, Lexi | 5' 10" (1.78m) | 150 lb (68kg) | 1999-12-28 | DePaul | 1 |
| C | 31 | (Belgium) | Linskens, Kyara | 6' 4" (1.93m) | 209 lb (95kg) | 1996-11-13 | Belgium | 1 |
| F | 4 | (United States) | Mack, Natasha | 6' 4" (1.93m) | 182 lb (83kg) | 1997-11-03 | Oklahoma State | 2 |
| G | 0 | (United States) | Plum, Kelsey | 5' 8" (1.73m) | 145 lb (66kg) | 1994-08-24 | Washington | 7 |
| F | 6 | (United States) | Poffenbarger, Saylor | 6' 2" (1.88m) | 189 lb (86kg) | 2002-04-14 | Maryland | R |
| F | 77 | (Spain) | Suárez, Marta | 6' 3" (1.91m) | | 2002-05-07 | TCU | R |
| F | 25 | (United States) | Thomas, Alyssa | 6' 2" (1.88m) | 203 lb (92kg) | 1992-04-12 | Maryland | 12 |
| F | 21 | (United States) | Westbeld, Maddy | 6' 3" (1.91m) | | 2002-02-10 | Notre Dame | 1 |
| G | 33 | (Australia) | Whitcomb, Sami | 5' 10" (1.78m) | 149 lb (68kg) | 1988-07-20 | Washington | 8 |
| G | — | (Sweden) | Holm, Klara (S) | 5' 8" (1.73m) | | 1999-08-28 | Sweden | – |
| G | 29 | (Serbia) | Nogić, Jovana (S) | 6' 0" (1.83m) | 170 lb (77kg) | 1997-12-17 | Serbia | R |
| G | – | (Spain) | Pueyo, Helena (S) | 6' 0" (1.83m) | | 2001-02-13 | Arizona | – |
| F | – | (United States) | Westbeld, Kathryn (injured) (S) | 6' 3" (1.91m) | | 1996-01-29 | Notre Dame | 1 |

Head coach
(United States) Nate Tibbetts (South Dakota)
Assistant coaches
(United States) John McCullough (Oklahoma)
(United States) Chevelle Saunsoci (Creighton)
(United States) TC Swirsky
(United States) Tangela Smith (Iowa)
(United States) Kristi Toliver (Maryland)
(United States) Megan Vogel (South Dakota State)

Legend

- (C) Team captain
- (DP) Unsigned draft pick
- (FA) Free agent
- (S) Suspended
- Injured

WNBA roster page

East
ATL
CHI
CON
IND
NY
TOR
WAS
West
DAL
GS
LV
LA
MIN
PHO
POR
SEA

=== Depth ===
| Pos. | Starter | Bench |
|---|---|---|
| PG | Jovana Nogić | Monique Akoa Makani; Kiana Williams |
| SG | Kahleah Copper | Shay Ciezki; Sami Whitcomb |
| SF | DeWanna Bonner | Noémie Brochant; Sha Carter |
| PF | Alyssa Thomas | Marta Suárez; Valériane Ayayi |
| C | Natasha Mack | Kalani Brown; Kyara Linskens |

== Schedule ==
=== Preseason ===
2026 pre-season game log
Total: 2–0 (Home: 2–0; Road: 0–0)
April: 2–0 (Home: 2–0; Road: 0–0)

| Game | Date | Team | Score | High points | High rebounds | High assists | Location Attendance | Record |
|---|---|---|---|---|---|---|---|---|
| 1 | April 25 | Chicago | W 108–104 | Kahleah Copper (19) | Natasha Mack (6) | Alyssa Thomas (8) | Sanford Pentagon; 3,537 | 1–0 |
| 2 | April 29 | Japan | W 86–60 | Kahleah Copper (17) | Natasha Mack (9) | Alyssa Thomas (9) | Mortgage Matchup Center | 2–0 |

2026 pre-season schedule

=== Regular season ===
2026 game log
Total: 16–28 (Home: 7–15; Road: 9–13)
May: 2–7 (Home: 1–3; Road: 1–4)

| Game | Date | Team | Score | High points | High rebounds | High assists | Location Attendance | Record |
|---|---|---|---|---|---|---|---|---|
| 1 | May 9 | @ Las Vegas | W 99–66 | Alyssa Thomas (20) | Natasha Mack (15) | Alyssa Thomas (9) | T-Mobile Arena; 16,511 | 1–0 |
| 2 | May 10 | @ Golden State | L 95–79 | Alyssa Thomas (19) | Alyssa Thomas (9) | Alyssa Thomas (11) | Chase Center; 18,064 | 1–1 |
| 3 | May 12 | Minnesota | L 88–84 | Kahleah Copper (30) | Natasha Mack (10) | Alyssa Thomas (8) | Mortgage Matchup Center; 10,826 | 1–2 |
| 4 | May 15 | Chicago | W 91–83 | Jovana Nogić (27) | Alyssa Thomas (11) | Alyssa Thomas (6) | Mortgage Matchup Center; 11,094 | 2–2 |
| 5 | May 19 | Toronto | L 98–90 | Kahleah Copper (18) | Natasha Mack (10) | Alyssa Thomas (8) | Mortgage Matchup Center; 9,337 | 2–3 |
| 6 | May 21 | Los Angeles | L 97–88 | Alyssa Thomas (23) | Natasha Mack (9) | Alyssa Thomas (7) | Mortgage Matchup Center; 10,953 | 2–4 |
| 7 | May 24 | @ Atlanta | L 82–80 | Copper, Thomas (20) | Alyssa Thomas (12) | Alyssa Thomas (7) | Gateway Center Arena; 3,575 | 2–5 |
| 8 | May 27 | @ New York | L 74–84 | Kahleah Copper (19) | Alyssa Thomas (7) | Alyssa Thomas (9) | Barclays Center; 14,995 | 2–6 |
| 9 | May 29 | @ New York | L 68–75 | Kahleah Copper (16) | Natasha Mack (9) | Alyssa Thomas (8) | Barclays Center; 17,579 | 2–7 |

June : 5–6 (Home: 1–3; Road: 4–3)

| Game | Date | Team | Score | High points | High rebounds | High assists | Location Attendance | Record |
|---|---|---|---|---|---|---|---|---|
| 10 | June 1 | Minnesota | L 77–111 | Kahleah Copper (18) | Natasha Mack (11) | Makani, Thomas (5) | Mortgage Matchup Center; 9,234 | 2–8 |
| 11 | June 3 | @ Seattle | W 72–68 | Copper, Mack (16) | Natasha Mack (10) | Alyssa Thomas (5) | Climate Pledge Arena; 9,109 | 3–8 |
| 12 | June 5 | @ Portland | W 78–72 | DeWanna Bonner (19) | DeWanna Bonner (5) | Jovana Nogić (6) | Moda Center; 12,046 | 4–8 |
| 13 | June 9 | @ Golden State | L 81–87 | Alyssa Thomas (22) | Natasha Mack (10) | Alyssa Thomas (9) | Chase Center; 18,064 | 4–9 |
| 14 | June 11 | @ Dallas | L 70–85 | Lexi Held (17) | Alyssa Thomas (9) | Alyssa Thomas (10) | College Park Center; 6,251 | 4–10 |
| 15 | June 13 | Los Angeles | L 102–111 (OT) | Kahleah Copper (41) | Natasha Mack (12) | Alyssa Thomas (12) | Mortgage Matchup Center; 9,234 | 4–11 |
| 16 | June 17 | Las Vegas | L 76–86 | Kahleah Copper (26) | Natasha Mack (8) | Alyssa Thomas (11) | Mortgage Matchup Center; 9,234 | 4–12 |
| 17 | June 20 | Seattle | W 93–73 | Valériane Ayayi (18) | Ayayi, Mack (10) | Noémie Brochant (10) | Mortgage Matchup Center; 9,662 | 5–12 |
| 18 | June 22 | @ Indiana | L 77–86 | Kahleah Copper (20) | Natasha Mack (7) | Alyssa Thomas (9) | Gainbridge Fieldhouse; 15,198 | 5–13 |
| 19 | June 24 | @ Indiana | W 111–109 | Kahleah Copper (28) | DeWanna Bonner (8) | Noémie Brochant (9) | Gainbridge Fieldhouse; 16,128 | 6–13 |
| 20 | June 27 | @ Toronto | W 89–80 | Kahleah Copper (27) | DeWanna Bonner (11) | Bonner, Linskens (3) | Scotiabank Arena; 15,687 | 7–13 |

July : 4–5 (Home: 3–3; Road: 1–2)

| Game | Date | Team | Score | High points | High rebounds | High assists | Location Attendance | Record |
|---|---|---|---|---|---|---|---|---|
| 21 | July 2 | Seattle | W 90–67 | Kahleah Copper (30) | Alyssa Thomas (13) | Alyssa Thomas (9) | Mortgage Matchup Center; 10,055 | 8–13 |
| 22 | July 7 | Chicago | L 66–77 | Kahleah Copper (25) | Bonner, Thomas (7) | Alyssa Thomas (5) | Mortgage Matchup Center; 9,586 | 8–14 |
| 23 | July 9 | Indiana | L 89–92 | Copper, Thomas (22) | DeWanna Bonner (7) | Alyssa Thomas (7) | Mortgage Matchup Center; 17,071 | 8–15 |
| 24 | July 11 | @ Las Vegas | L 58–106 | Monique Akoa Makani (13) | Valériane Ayayi (7) | Bonner, Whitcomb (3) | Michelob Ultra Arena; 10,321 | 8–16 |
| 25 | July 13 | @ Minnesota | L 100–104 | Kahleah Copper (26) | DeWanna Bonner (9) | Alyssa Thomas (12) | Target Center; 10,221 | 8–17 |
| 26 | July 17 | Connecticut | L 83–96 | Kahleah Copper (21) | DeWanna Bonner (10) | Alyssa Thomas (6) | Mortgage Matchup Center; 10,321 | 8–18 |
| 27 | July 19 | Connecticut | W 72–63 | DeWanna Bonner (21) | Bonner, Makani, Thomas (6) | Alyssa Thomas (11) | Mortgage Matchup Center; 13,481 | 9–18 |
| 28 | July 22 | @ Los Angeles | W 86–82 | Kahleah Copper (21) | Alyssa Thomas (11) | Alyssa Thomas (15) | Crypto.com Arena; 16,900 | 10–18 |
All-Star Game
| 29 | July 29 | Golden State | W 91–89 | Kahleah Copper (27) | DeWanna Bonner (10) | Alyssa Thomas (8) | Mortgage Matchup Center; 10,152 | 11–18 |

August : 3–8 (Home: 1–5; Road: 2–3)

| Game | Date | Team | Score | High points | High rebounds | High assists | Location Attendance | Record |
|---|---|---|---|---|---|---|---|---|
| 30 | August 1 | New York | L 92–94 | Bonner, Copper (25) | DeWanna Bonner (7) | Alyssa Thomas (7) | Mortgage Matchup Center; 10,097 | 11–19 |
| 2 | August 3 | @ Chicago | W 106–101 | Kahleah Copper (31) | Alyssa Thomas (15) | Alyssa Thomas (12) | Wintrust Arena; 7,011 | 12–19 |
| 32 | August 5 | @ Atlanta | L 82–96 | Kelsey Plum (19) | DeWanna Bonner (11) | Alyssa Thomas (7) | Gateway Center Arena; 3,575 | 12–20 |
| 33 | August 7 | @ Connecticut | L 72–75 | Kelsey Plum (25) | DeWanna Bonner (11) | Alyssa Thomas (5) | Mohegan Sun Arena; 8,910 | 12–21 |
| 34 | August 9 | @ Washington | L 75–95 | Kahleah Copper (15) | Alyssa Thomas (10) | Alyssa Thomas (6) | CareFirst Arena; 4,200 | 12–22 |
| 35 | August 11 | @ Los Angeles | W 94–87 | Noémie Brochant (24) | Bonner, Thomas (7) | Alyssa Thomas (9) | Crypto.com Arena; 6,247 | 13–22 |
| 36 | August 16 | Portland | L 85–88 | DeWanna Bonner (23) | Alyssa Thomas (11) | Alyssa Thomas (9) | Mortgage Matchup Center; 16,513 | 13–23 |
| 37 | August 22 | Atlanta | L 89–99 | Kahleah Copper (38) | Alyssa Thomas (16) | Alyssa Thomas (10) | Mortgage Matchup Center; 12,431 | 13–24 |
| 38 | August 25 | Washington | L 84–94 | Copper, Mack (19) | Natasha Mack (8) | Alyssa Thomas (10) | Mortgage Matchup Center; 10,459 | 13–25 |
| 39 | August 27 | Washington | L 73–80 | Kahleah Copper (35) | Alyssa Thomas (10) | Alyssa Thomas (8) | Mortgage Matchup Center; 9,040 | 13–26 |
| 40 | August 29 | Toronto | W 101–69 | Brochant, Ciezki (15) | Natasha Mack (8) | Alyssa Thomas (12) | Mortgage Matchup Center; 11,699 | 14–26 |

September : 2–2 (Home: 1–1; Road: 1–1)

| Game | Date | Team | Score | High points | High rebounds | High assists | Location Attendance | Record |
|---|---|---|---|---|---|---|---|---|
| 41 | September 17 | @ Portland | W 94–91 | Shay Ciezki (22) | Alyssa Thomas (8) | Brochant, Thomas (6) | Moda Center; 13,641 | 15–26 |
| 42 | September 19 | @ Dallas | L 82–87 | Lexi Held (21) | Alyssa Thomas (10) | Alyssa Thomas (11) | College Park Center; 6,251 | 15–27 |
| 43 | September 21 | Dallas | W 87–86 | Kahleah Copper (31) | Alyssa Thomas (11) | Alyssa Thomas (12) | Mortgage Matchup Center; 11,941 | 16–27 |
| 44 | September 24 | Las Vegas | L 82–100 | Kahleah Copper (18) | Mack, Thomas (7) | Alyssa Thomas (9) | Mortgage Matchup Center; 12,385 | 16–28 |

2026 season schedule

Notes:

- Games highlighted in represent Commissioner's Cup games.

== Standings ==
| # | Team | W | L | PCT | GB | Conf. | Home | Road | Cup |
|---|---|---|---|---|---|---|---|---|---|
| 1 | y — Minnesota Lynx | 33 | 11 | .750 | – | 20–3 | 15–7 | 18–4 | 6–1 |
| 2 | x — Golden State Valkyries | 32 | 12 | .727 | 1 | 15–8 | 17–5 | 15–7 | 5–2 |
| 3 | x — Las Vegas Aces | 31 | 13 | .705 | 2 | 17–6 | 15–7 | 16–6 | 6–1 |
| 4 | x — Atlanta Dream | 30 | 14 | .682 | 3 | 15–5 | 15–7 | 15–7 | 4–2 |
| 5 | x — Washington Mystics | 28 | 16 | .636 | 5 | 15–5 | 15–7 | 13–9 | 3–3 |
| 6 | x — Indiana Fever | 28 | 16 | .636 | 5 | 14–6 | 15–7 | 13–9 | 5–1 |
| 7 | x — Dallas Wings | 27 | 17 | .614 | 6 | 13–10 | 16–6 | 11–11 | 4–3 |
| 8 | cx – New York Liberty | 26 | 18 | .591 | 7 | 13–7 | 14–8 | 12–10 | 6–0 |
| 9 | e — Portland Fire | 17 | 27 | .386 | 16 | 7–16 | 9–13 | 8–14 | 2–5 |
| 10 | e — Phoenix Mercury | 16 | 28 | .364 | 17 | 10–13 | 7–15 | 9–13 | 2–5 |
| 11 | e — Chicago Sky | 16 | 28 | .364 | 17 | 4–16 | 11–11 | 5–17 | 1–5 |
| 12 | e — Los Angeles Sparks | 16 | 28 | .364 | 17 | 9–14 | 8–14 | 8–14 | 3–4 |
| 13 | e — Toronto Tempo | 11 | 33 | .250 | 22 | 5–15 | 7–15 | 4–18 | 2–4 |
| 14 | e — Connecticut Sun | 11 | 33 | .250 | 22 | 4–16 | 8–14 | 3–19 | 0–6 |
| 15 | e — Seattle Storm | 8 | 36 | .182 | 25 | 1–22 | 6–16 | 2–20 | 0–7 |

Notes

(#) – League Standing
c – Commissioner's Cup winner
y – Regular season champion
x – Clinched playoff berth
e – Eliminated from playoff contention
Source: Overall standings and Commissioner's Cup Standings
