= Marine Fauthoux =

French basketball player (born 2001)

- Fauthoux in 2026

No. 4 – Galatasaray
- Position: Point guard
- League: Turkish Super League; EuroLeague Women; WNBA

Personal information
- Born: 23 January 2001 (age 25) Pau, France
- Listed height: 1.76 m (5 ft 9 in)

Career information
- WNBA draft: 2021: 3rd round, 29th overall pick
- Drafted by: New York Liberty
- Playing career: 2018–present

Career history
- 2018–2020: Tarbes Gespe Bigorre
- 2020–2021: Lyon ASVEL Féminin
- 2021–2023: Basket Landes
- 2023–2024: Lyon ASVEL Féminin
- 2024–2025: Çukurova Basketbol
- 2026–present: New York Liberty
- 2026–present: Galatasaray

Career highlights
- WNBA Commissioner's Cup Champion (2026)
- Stats at Basketball Reference
Medals
Women's basketball
Representing (France) France
Olympic Games
Silver medal – second place	2024 Paris	Team
Bronze medal – third place	2020 Tokyo	Team
EuroBasket
Silver medal – second place	2019 Serbia/Latvia
Bronze medal – third place	2023 Israel/Slovenia

Marine Fauthoux (born 23 January 2001) is a French basketball player for Galatasaray of the Women's Basketball Super League and the New York Liberty in WNBA. She has played for the French national team in the Tokyo 2020 and the Paris 2024 Olympic games.

She is the daughter of Frédéric Fauthoux, former point guard of Élan Béarnais and of the French national team, now head coach of JL Bourg Basket and France men's national basketball team.

== Career ==
On July 28, 2026, she signed a contract with the Turkish giant Galatasaray. Before joining the Turkish team, she made her debut in the 2026 WNBA season with the New York Liberty, the same team that drafted her in 2021, imitating her teammate Marine Johannès.

== International ==
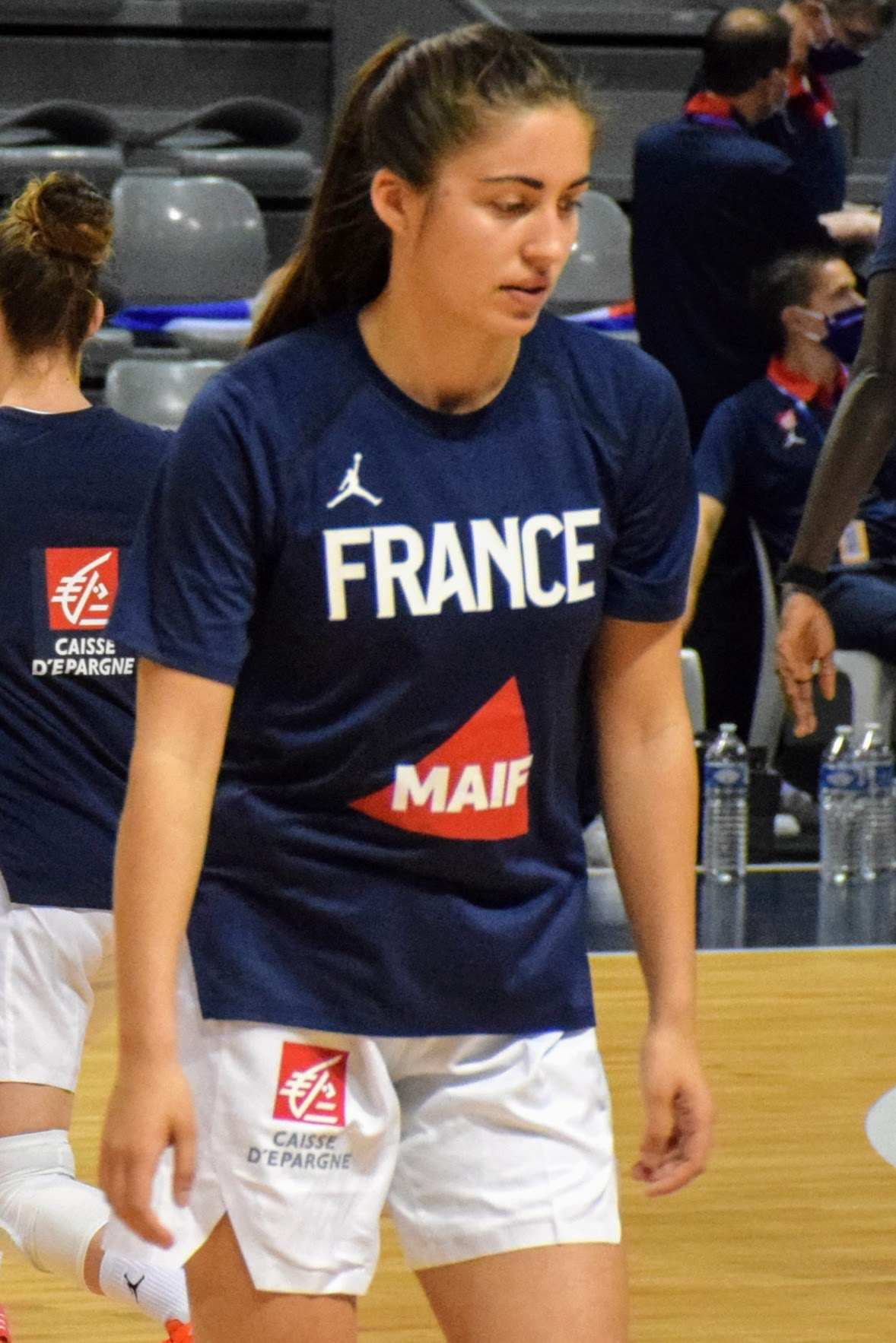
Fauthoux in 2021

She represented France at the FIBA Women's EuroBasket 2019.

== Career statistics ==
Legend
GP	Games played	GS	Games started	MPG	Minutes per game	RPG	Rebounds per game
APG	Assists per game	SPG	Steals per game	BPG	Blocks per game	PPG	Points per game
TO	Turnovers per game	FG%	Field-goal percentage	3P%	3-point field-goal percentage	FT%	Free-throw percentage
**Bold**	Career best	°	League leader

=== WNBA ===
==== Regular season ====
WNBA regular season statistics
Year	Team	GP	GS	MPG	FG%	3P%	FT%	RPG	APG	SPG	BPG	TO	PPG
2026	New York	21	0	12.4	.412	.300	.706	2.0	1.9	.1	.0	1.1	4.4
**Career**	1 year, 1 team	21	0	12.4	.412	.300	.706	2.0	1.9	.1	.0	1.1	4.4

==== Playoffs ====
WNBA playoff statistics
Year	Team	GP	GS	MPG	FG%	3P%	FT%	RPG	APG	SPG	BPG	TO	PPG
2026	New York	4	0	19.3	.533	.357	1.000	2.8	2.0	.5	.3	1.3	7.8
**Career**	1 year, 1 team	4	0	19.3	.533	.357	1.000	2.8	2.0	.5	.3	1.3	7.8
