= 2026 Chicago Sky season =

- Head coach: Tyler Marsh
- Arena: Wintrust Arena; United Center

Results
- Record: 16–28 (.364)
- Place: 5th (Eastern)
- Playoff finish: Did not qualify

The 2026 Chicago Sky season was the franchise's 21st season in the Women's National Basketball Association and second under head coach Tyler Marsh. The Sky finished with a 16–28 record, missing the playoffs for the third straight season.

== Draft ==
The draft was held on April 13, 2026, at 7:30 pm EDT, and broadcast on ESPN.

Round	Pick	Player	Position	Nationality	College/Club	Outcome	Ref.
1	5	Gabriela Jaquez	G	United States/Mexico	UCLA Bruins	Signed four-year rookie contract	
2	21	Latasha Lattimore	F	Canada	Ole Miss Rebels	Waived May 3	
3	32	Tonie Morgan	G	United States	Kentucky Wildcats	Waived May 3	

== Transactions ==
=== Front office and coaching ===
Date	Details	Ref.
November 24, 2025	Hired Latricia Trammell as an assistant coach	

=== Trades ===
April
April 1	To Chicago Sky 2026 No. 21 draft pick Protection from Fire during 2026 WNBA expansion draft	To Portland Fire 2026 No. 17 draft pick
April 1	To Chicago Sky Protection from Tempo during 2026 WNBA expansion draft	To Toronto Tempo 2026 No. 26 draft pick
April 6	To Chicago Sky 2027 first-round pick 2028 first-round pick	To Atlanta Dream Angel Reese; 2028 second-round pick swap
April 11	To Chicago Sky Jacy Sheldon	To Washington Mystics 2028 first-round pick

== Roster ==
Chicago Sky roster
Players
Coaches

Pos.	No.	Nat.	Name	Height	Weight	DOB	From	Yrs
G	24	(United States)	Banham, Rachel	5' 9" (1.75m)	175 lb (79kg)	1993-07-15	Minnesota	9
C	10	(Brazil)	Cardoso, Kamilla	6' 7" (2.01m)	215 lb (98kg)	2001-04-30	South Carolina	2
G/F	7	(United States)	Carrington, DiJonai	5' 11" (1.8m)	175 lb (79kg)	1998-01-08	Baylor	5
G	9	(United States)	Cloud, Natasha	5' 10" (1.78m)	160 lb (73kg)	1992-02-22	Saint Joseph's	10
G	35	(Mali)	Coulibaly, Aicha	6' 0" (1.83m)		2001-10-18	Texas A&M	R
G	4	(United States)	Diggins, Skylar (injured)	5' 9" (1.75m)	140 lb (64kg)	1990-08-02	Notre Dame	10
F	5	(United States)	Jackson, Rickea (injured)	6' 2" (1.88m)	175 lb (79kg)	2001-03-16	Tennessee	2
G	11	(Mexico)	Jaquez, Gabriela	6' 0" (1.83m)		2003-11-19	UCLA	R
G	15	(United States)	Maly, Morgan	6' 1" (1.85m)		2002-01-25	Creighton	R
G	20	(United States)	Martin, Kate	6' 0" (1.83m)	172 lb (78kg)	2000-06-05	Iowa	2
G	0	(United States)	Sheldon, Jacy	5' 10" (1.78m)	140 lb (64kg)	2000-08-23	Ohio State	2
F/C	30	(United States)	Stevens, Azurá	6' 6" (1.98m)	180 lb (82kg)	1996-02-01	Connecticut	7
G	12	(United States)	Taylor, Sydney	5' 9" (1.75m)		2001-06-21	Louisville	R
G	22	(Hungary)	Vandersloot, Courtney	5' 8" (1.73m)	137 lb (62kg)	1989-02-08	Gonzaga	14
C	1	(United States)	Williams, Elizabeth	6' 3" (1.91m)	200 lb (91kg)	1993-06-23	Duke	10
F	–	(Slovenia)	Sivka, Ajša (DP)	6' 4" (1.93m)		2005-11-23	Slovenia	–

Head coach
(United States) Tyler Marsh (Birmingham–Southern)
Assistant coaches
(United States) Kelly Faris (Connecticut)
(United States) Jhared Simpson (Wheeling)
(United States) Latricia Trammell (East Central)
(United States) Rena Wakama (Western Carolina)
Player development
(United States) David Simon (Purdue Fort Wayne)
Athletic trainer
(United States) Meghan Lockerby
Strength and conditioning coach
(United States) Ann Crosby

Legend

- (C) Team captain
- (DP) Unsigned draft pick
- (FA) Free agent
- (S) Suspended
- Injured

WNBA roster page

East
ATL
CHI
CON
IND
NY
TOR
WAS
West
DAL
GS
LV
LA
MIN
PHO
POR
SEA

=== Depth chart ===
Pos.	Starter	Bench
PG
SG
SF
PF
C

== Schedule ==
=== Preseason ===
2026 pre-season game log
Total: 0–2 (Home: 0–1; Road: 0–1)
April: 0–2 (Home: 0–1; Road: 0–1)

Game	Date	Team	Score	High points	High rebounds	High assists	Location Attendance	Record
1	April 25	@ Phoenix	L 104–108	Hailey Van Lith (20)	Kamilla Cardoso (4)	Sydney Taylor (5)	Sanford Pentagon; 3,357	0–1
2	April 29	Atlanta	L 78–87	Sydney Taylor (23)	Morgan, Westbeld (5)	Hailey Van Lith (6)	Wintrust Arena; 6,139	0–2

2026 pre-season schedule

=== Regular season ===
2026 game log
Total: 16–28 (Home: 11–11; Road: 5–17)
May: 3–5 (Home: 0–4; Road: 3–1)

Game	Date	Team	Score	High points	High rebounds	High assists	Location Attendance	Record
1	May 9	@ Portland	W 98–83	Kamilla Cardoso (22)	Kamilla Cardoso (14)	Skylar Diggins (7)	Moda Center; 19,335	1–0
2	May 13	@ Golden State	W 69–63	Rickea Jackson (18)	Cardoso, Sheldon (7)	Skylar Diggins (7)	Chase Center; 18,064	2–0
3	May 15	@ Phoenix	L 83–91	Rickea Jackson (29)	Kamilla Cardoso (8)	Natasha Cloud (7)	Mortgage Matchup Center; 11,094	2–1
4	May 17	@ Minnesota	W 86–79	Gabriela Jaquez (20)	Kamilla Cardoso (12)	Natasha Cloud (7)	Target Center; 10,001	3–1
5	May 20	Dallas	L 89–99	Kamilla Cardoso (24)	Kamilla Cardoso (11)	Cardoso, Cloud (5)	Wintrust Arena; 9,025	3–2
6	May 23	Minnesota	L 75–85	Kamilla Cardoso (17)	Kamilla Cardoso (7)	Skylar Diggins (6)	Wintrust Arena; 7,030	3–3
7	May 27	Toronto	L 104–111	Sydney Taylor (27)	Elizabeth Williams (9)	Cloud, Diggins (9)	Wintrust Arena; 6,209	3–4
8	May 29	Minnesota	L 58–79	Cardoso, Diggins (12)	Kamilla Cardoso (13)	Sydney Taylor (4)	Wintrust Arena; 7,004	3–5

June : 3–8 (Home: 3–3; Road: 0–5)

Game	Date	Team	Score	High points	High rebounds	High assists	Location Attendance	Record
9	June 2	@ Washington	L 72–90	Sydney Taylor (15)	Kamilla Cardoso (13)	Kamilla Cardoso (5)	CareFirst Arena; 4,200	3–6
10	June 5	Connecticut	W 85–80	Skylar Diggins (24)	Azurá Stevens (10)	Natasha Cloud (5)	Wintrust Arena; 6,594	4–6
11	June 7	@ Toronto	L 68–85	Azurá Stevens (18)	Azurá Stevens (10)	Cloud, Diggins (3)	Coca-Cola Coliseum; 8,210	4–7
12	June 9	Atlanta	L 75–82	Natasha Cloud (18)	Azurá Stevens (7)	Kamilla Cardoso (5)	Wintrust Arena; 6,921	4–8
13	June 11	@ Indiana	L 106–114 (OT)	Sydney Taylor (30)	Azurá Stevens (9)	Azurá Stevens (6)	Gainbridge Fieldhouse; 15,578	4–9
14	June 17	New York	L 95–96	Sydney Taylor (24)	Azurá Stevens (6)	Skylar Diggins (8)	Wintrust Arena; 7,225	4–10
15	June 20	@ Dallas	L 92–93	Kamilla Cardoso (26)	Azurá Stevens (11)	Cloud, Diggins (6)	College Park Center; 6,251	4–11
16	June 22	@ Connecticut	L 63–92	Kamilla Cardoso (16)	Kamilla Cardoso (14)	Skylar Diggins (4)	Wintrust Arena; 7,036	4–12
17	June 24	Portland	W 101–78	Skylar Diggins (15)	Azurá Stevens (11)	Skylar Diggins (6)	Wintrust Arena; 7,468	5–12
18	June 26	Portland	W 124–94	Kamilla Cardoso (30)	Kamilla Cardoso (8)	Skylar Diggins (9)	Wintrust Arena; 7,228	6–12
19	June 28	Las Vegas	L 99–107	Cardoso, Stevens (24)	Kamilla Cardoso (8)	Courtney Vandersloot (8)	United Center; 11,476	6–13

July : 4–5 (Home: 3–0; Road: 1–5)

Game	Date	Team	Score	High points	High rebounds	High assists	Location Attendance	Record
20	July 3	@ Las Vegas	L 90–98 (OT)	Skylar Diggins (19)	Kamilla Cardoso (10)	Natasha Cloud (5)	T-Mobile Arena; 15,837	6–14
21	July 7	@ Phoenix	W 77–66	Sydney Taylor (16)	Azurá Stevens (10)	Natasha Cloud (6)	Mortgage Matchup Center; 9,586	7–14
22	July 10	@ Los Angeles	L 87–102	Cardoso, Jaquez, Taylor (15)	Cardoso, Stevens (8)	Natasha Cloud (7)	Crypto.com Arena; 11,827	7–15
23	July 12	@ Dallas	L 91–96	Sydney Taylor (20)	Cardoso, Stevens (13)	Cloud, Stevens, Vandersloot (3)	American Airlines Center; 13,236	7–16
24	July 15	Seattle	W 95–90	Azurá Stevens (20)	Azurá Stevens (8)	Cloud, Vandersloot (6)	Wintrust Arena; 9,025	8–16
25	July 17	Los Angeles	W 96–82	Sydney Taylor (19)	Kamilla Cardoso (11)	Natasha Cloud (9)	Wintrust Arena; 8,123	9–16
26	July 19	@ Atlanta	L 91–93	Azurá Stevens (20)	Azurá Stevens (9)	Courtney Vandersloot (6)	Gateway Center Arena; 3,575	9–17
27	July 22	@ New York	L 94–95	Sydney Taylor (31)	Azurá Stevens (7)	Natasha Cloud (7)	Barclays Center; 16,783	9–18
All-Star Game
28	July 30	Connecticut	W 94–88	Kamilla Cardoso (26)	Kamilla Cardoso (6)	Taylor, Vandersloot (6)	Wintrust Arena; 7,297	10–18

August : 5–7 (Home: 4–3; Road: 1–4)

Game	Date	Team	Score	High points	High rebounds	High assists	Location Attendance	Record
29	August 1	Las Vegas	W 84–83	Sydney Taylor (29)	Kamilla Cardoso (12)	Courtney Vandersloot (5)	Wintrust Arena; 9,025	11–18
30	August 3	Phoenix	L 101–106	Carrington, Cardoso, Vandersloot (16)	Kamilla Cardoso (13)	Courtney Vandersloot (10)	Wintrust Arena; 7,011	11–19
31	August 5	Los Angeles	W 95–88	Cardoso, Cloud, Sheldon (15)	Kamilla Cardoso (7)	Natasha Cloud (9)	Wintrust Arena; 7,129	12–19
32	August 8	Indiana	L 86–90	Banham, Cloud (17)	Kamilla Cardoso (9)	Courtney Vandersloot (6)	United Center; 16,065	12–20
33	August 10	@ Seattle	L 88–97	DiJonai Carrington (26)	Kamilla Cardoso (13)	Natasha Cloud (8)	Climate Pledge Arena; 11,655	12–21
34	August 12	@ Golden State	L 71–91	Kamilla Cardoso (20)	Kamilla Cardoso (6)	Natasha Cloud (9)	Chase Center; 18,064	12–22
35	August 16	@ Seattle	W 82–80	Kamilla Cardoso (22)	Kamilla Cardoso (12)	Courtney Vandersloot (5)	Climate Pledge Arena; 12,916	13–22
36	August 18	New York	W 93–86	Natasha Cloud (35)	Kamilla Cardoso (12)	Cloud, Vandersloot (6)	Wintrust Arena; 7,099	14–22
37	August 21	Golden State	W 73–70	Natasha Cloud (17)	Kamilla Cardoso (10)	Courtney Vandersloot (5)	Wintrust Arena; 8,028	15–22
38	August 23	Indiana	L 90–103	Natasha Cloud (16)	Azurá Stevens (8)	Cloud, Vandersloot (7)	Wintrust Arena; 9,248	15–23
39	August 25	@ Connecticut	L 81–87	Kamilla Cardoso (24)	Kamilla Cardoso (13)	Courtney Vandersloot (9)	Mohegan Sun Arena; 8,048	15–24
40	August 29	@ New York	L 66–85	Natasha Cloud (14)	Vandersloot, Williams (5)	Courtney Vandersloot (6)	Barclays Center; 17,107	15–25

September : 1–3 (Home: 1–1; Road: 0–2)

Game	Date	Team	Score	High points	High rebounds	High assists	Location Attendance	Record
41	September 17	Washington	L 80–110	Courtney Vandersloot (14)	Kamilla Cardoso (7)	Courtney Vandersloot (5)	Wintrust Arena; 8,945	15–26
42	September 19	@ Atlanta	L 81–106	Gabriela Jaquez (14)	Cardoso, Maly (6)	Courtney Vandersloot (6)	Gateway Center Arena; 17,099	15–27
43	September 22	Toronto	W 97–85	Jaquez, Taylor (18)	Elizabeth Williams (11)	Courtney Vandersloot (9)	Wintrust Arena; 8,036	16–27
44	September 24	@ Washington	L 93–101	Cardoso, Taylor, Vandersloot (16)	Kamilla Cardoso (10)	Courtney Vandersloot (7)	Capital One Arena; 9,798	16–28

2026 season schedule

Notes:

- Games highlighted in represent Commissioner's Cup games.

== Standings ==
#	Team	W	L	PCT	GB	Conf.	Home	Road	Cup
1	y — Minnesota Lynx	33	11	.750	–	20–3	15–7	18–4	6–1
2	x — Golden State Valkyries	32	12	.727	1	15–8	17–5	15–7	5–2
3	x — Las Vegas Aces	31	13	.705	2	17–6	15–7	16–6	6–1
4	x — Atlanta Dream	30	14	.682	3	15–5	15–7	15–7	4–2
5	x — Washington Mystics	28	16	.636	5	15–5	15–7	13–9	3–3
6	x — Indiana Fever	28	16	.636	5	14–6	15–7	13–9	5–1
7	x — Dallas Wings	27	17	.614	6	13–10	16–6	11–11	4–3
8	cx – New York Liberty	26	18	.591	7	13–7	14–8	12–10	6–0
9	e — Portland Fire	17	27	.386	16	7–16	9–13	8–14	2–5
10	e — Phoenix Mercury	16	28	.364	17	10–13	7–15	9–13	2–5
11	e — Chicago Sky	16	28	.364	17	4–16	11–11	5–17	1–5
12	e — Los Angeles Sparks	16	28	.364	17	9–14	8–14	8–14	3–4
13	e — Toronto Tempo	11	33	.250	22	5–15	7–15	4–18	2–4
14	e — Connecticut Sun	11	33	.250	22	4–16	8–14	3–19	0–6
15	e — Seattle Storm	8	36	.182	25	1–22	6–16	2–20	0–7

Notes

(#) – League Standing
c – Commissioner's Cup winner
y – Regular season champion
x – Clinched playoff berth
e – Eliminated from playoff contention
Source: Overall standings and Commissioner's Cup Standings
