= Pauline Astier =

French basketball player (born 2002)

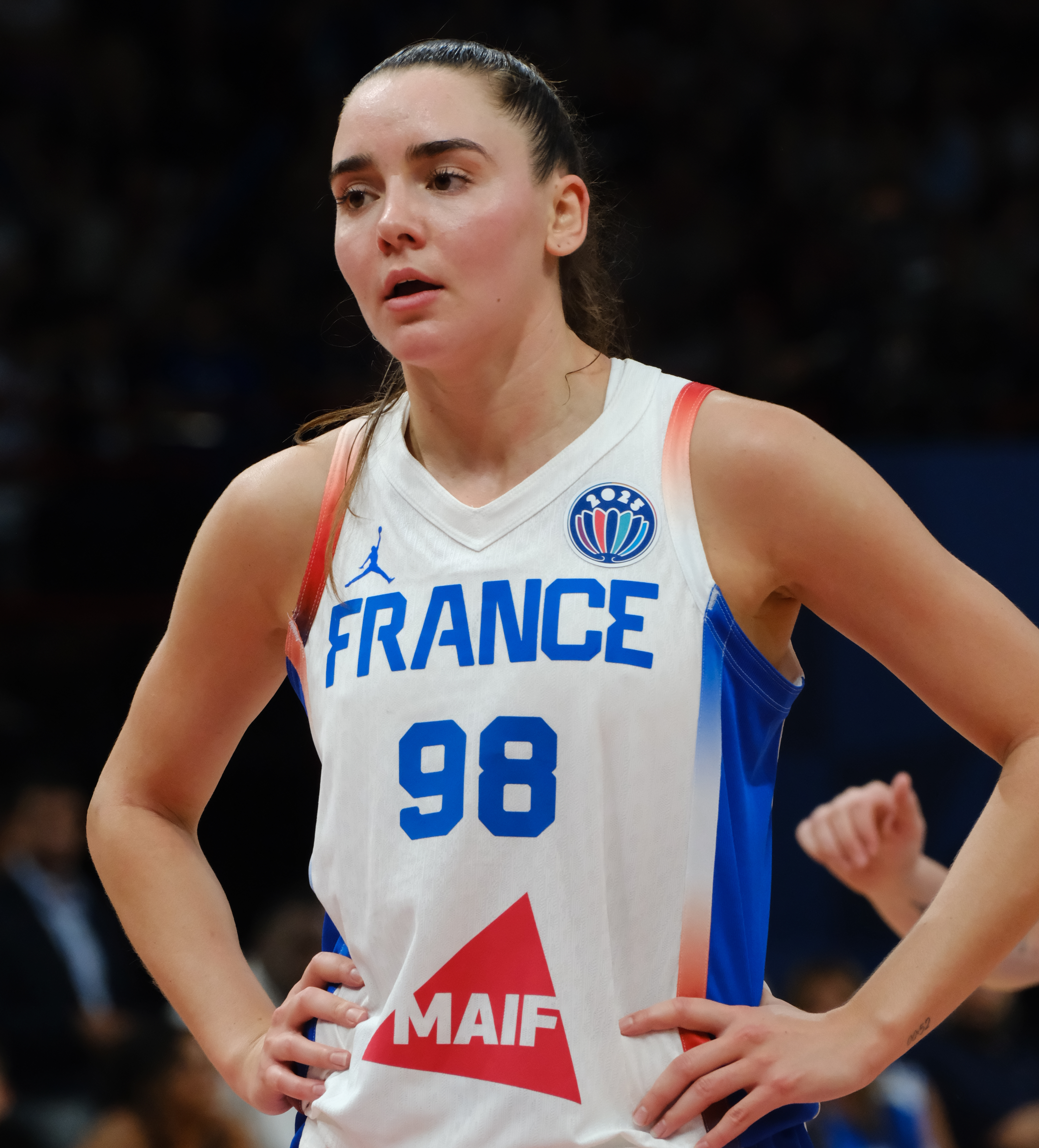
- Astier in 2025

No. 18 – New York Liberty
- Position: Guard
- League: WNBA

Personal information
- Born: 15 February 2002 (age 24) Tarbes, France
- Listed height: 5 ft 11 in (1.80 m)

Career information
- Playing career: 2019–present

Career history
- 2019–2025: Tango Bourges Basket
- 2025–2026: USK Praha
- 2026–present: New York Liberty

Career highlights
- WNBA All-Rookie Team (2026); WNBA Commissioner's Cup Champion (2026)
- Stats at Basketball Reference

Pauline Astier (born 15 February 2002) is a French professional basketball player for the New York Liberty of the Women's National Basketball Association (WNBA). She previously played for Tango Bourges Basket and USK Praha.

== Early life ==
Astier was born on 15 February 2002 in Tarbes, France. Her parents, Nathalie Fourcade and Frédéric Astier, were both professional basketball players in France. She has a twin sister, and they both played basketball from a young age. Growing up, she was first a member of the club Tarbes Gespe Bigorre. Astier later played for Séméac Olympique Basket and UA Laloubère. In 2017, she became a member of the youth team for Tango Bourges Basket.

== Professional career ==
Astier debuted for Tango Bourges's senior team in 2019 in the Ligue Féminine de Basketball (LFB) and EuroLeague Women. During the 2021–22 season, she helped Tango Bourges to championships of both the LFB and the EuroCup Women, with a victory by a score of 74–38 in the latter, and she was honored as the LFB's best young player. Her mother had played for a European championship team 26 years prior. The following season, Astier averaged 6.8 points, 2.2 assists, and 2.1 rebounds per game, earning the EuroLeague's best young player award while her team reached the quarterfinals of the EuroLeague tournament. She won the French Cup with Tango Bourges in 2024 and then left the team in 2025. She spent the 2025–26 season with USK Praha, averaging 10.2 points, 5.6 assists, 3.2 rebounds and 1.9 steals per game. She helped them to the 2025 FIBA Europe SuperCup Women title where they defeated ESB Villeneuve-d'Ascq and Astier was named MVP after recording 17 points and 15 assists.

After the 2025–26 season with USK Praha, Astier signed with the New York Liberty of the Women's National Basketball Association (WNBA) in April 2026. She impressed in training camp and made the opening-day roster.

== International career ==
Astier received her first call-up to the France national team in July 2022. By April 2025, she had made 13 appearances for the national team.

== Career statistics ==
Legend
| GP | Games played | GS | Games started | MPG | Minutes per game | RPG | Rebounds per game |
| APG | Assists per game | SPG | Steals per game | BPG | Blocks per game | PPG | Points per game |
| TO | Turnovers per game | FG% | Field-goal percentage | 3P% | 3-point field-goal percentage | FT% | Free-throw percentage |
| **Bold** | Career best | ° | League leader |

=== WNBA ===
==== Regular season ====
WNBA regular season statistics
| Year | Team | GP | GS | MPG | FG% | 3P% | FT% | RPG | APG | SPG | BPG | TO | PPG |
|---|---|---|---|---|---|---|---|---|---|---|---|---|---|
| 2026 | New York | 44° | 39 | 23.3 | .546 | .333 | .875 | 2.7 | 3.3 | .8 | .1 | 1.7 | 9.3 |
| **Career** | 1 year, 1 team | 44 | 39 | 23.3 | .546 | .333 | .875 | 2.7 | 3.3 | .8 | .1 | 1.7 | 9.3 |

==== Playoffs ====
WNBA playoff statistics
| Year | Team | GP | GS | MPG | FG% | 3P% | FT% | RPG | APG | SPG | BPG | TO | PPG |
|---|---|---|---|---|---|---|---|---|---|---|---|---|---|
| 2026 | New York | 5 | 5 | 21.2 | .407 | .500 | — | 4.0 | 2.0 | .8 | .0 | 2.2 | 5.0 |
| **Career** | 1 year, 1 team | 5 | 5 | 21.2 | .407 | .500 | — | 4.0 | 2.0 | .8 | .0 | 2.2 | 5.0 |
