= 2026 Indiana Fever season =

- Head coach: Stephanie White
- Arena: Gainbridge Fieldhouse

Results
- Record: 28–16 (.636)
- Place: 3rd (Eastern)
- Playoff finish: 6th seed Lost in First Round 1–2 to Las Vegas Aces

The 2026 Indiana Fever season was the franchise's 27th season in the WNBA and their fourth under head coach, Stephanie White. The team reached the 2026 WNBA playoffs, but lost to the Las Vegas Aces in the first round.

== Draft ==
| Round | Pick | Player | Position | Nationality | College/Club | Outcome | Ref. |
|---|---|---|---|---|---|---|---|
| 1 | 10 | Raven Johnson | Guard | (United States) USA | South Carolina Gamecocks | Signed rookie contract on April 18 | |
| 2 | 25 | Justine Pissott | Guard/Forward | (United States) USA | Vanderbilt Commodores | Signed a player development contract on April 17, signed with Las Vegas Aces on July 7 | |
| 3 | 40 | Jessica Timmons | Guard | (United States) USA | Alabama Crimson Tide | Signed rookie contract on April 18; Waived on May 6 | |

== Transactions ==
=== Front office and coaching ===
| Date | Details | Ref. |
|---|---|---|
| June 30 | Hired Jas Bell as global design and product director | |
| July 1 | Hired Gary Kloppenburg as interim team advisor and promoted Tully Bevilaqua to interim assistant coach | |

=== Free agency ===
==== Core designation ====
| Player | Date | Notes | Ref. |
|---|---|---|---|
| Kelsey Mitchell | April 6 | Signed one-year deal on April 11 | |

==== Re-signed / extensions ====
| Player | Date | Notes | Ref. |
|---|---|---|---|
| Lexie Hull | April 11 | Two-year deal | |
| Kelsey Mitchell | April 11 | One-year deal | |
| Sophie Cunningham | April 12 | One-year deal | |
| Damiris Dantas | April 12 | Two-year deal | |
| Aliyah Boston | April 17 | Four-year extension | |
| Caitlin Clark | April 28 | Exercised team option (Fourth-year) | |

==== Additions ====
| Player | Date | Notes | Former Team | Ref. |
|---|---|---|---|---|
| Monique Billings | April 11 | Two-year deal | Golden State Valkyries | |
| Tyasha Harris | April 12 | One-year deal | Dallas Wings | |
| Myisha Hines-Allen | April 13 | One-year deal | Dallas Wings | |
| Megan McConnell | April 13 | Training camp contract | Bendigo Spirit | |
| Kayana Traylor | April 13 | Training camp contract | Athletes Unlimited | |
| Shatori Walker-Kimbrough | April 15 | Training camp contract | Atlanta Dream | |
| Justine Pissott | April 17 | Player development contract | Vanderbilt Commodores | |
| Raven Johnson | April 18 | Rookie contract (2026 draft pick – No. 10) | South Carolina Gamecocks | |
| Jessica Timmons | April 18 | Rookie contract (2026 draft pick – No. 40) | Alabama Crimson Tide | |
| Bree Hall | May 11 | Player development contract | Free agent | |
| Grace VanSlooten | May 22 | Rest-of-season contract | Free agent | |

=== Subtractions / unsigned ===
| Player | Date | Reason | New Team | Ref. |
|---|---|---|---|---|
| Chloe Bibby | April 3 | Expansion draft | Portland Fire | |
| Kristy Wallace | April 3 | Expansion draft | Toronto Tempo | |
| Natasha Howard | April 12 | Free agency – unrestricted | Minnesota Lynx | |
| Megan McConnell | May 6 | Waived | — | |
| Jessica Timmons | May 6 | Waived | — | |
| Kayana Traylor | May 6 | Waived | — | |
| Shatori Walker-Kimbrough | May 21 | Waived | — | |

== Roster ==
Indiana Fever roster
Players
Coaches

| Pos. | No. | Nat. | Name | Height | Weight | DOB | From | Yrs |
|---|---|---|---|---|---|---|---|---|
| F | 25 | (United States) | Billings, Monique | 6' 4" (1.93m) | 190 lb (86kg) | 1996-05-02 | UCLA | 8 |
| F/C | 7 | (United States) | Boston, Aliyah | 6' 5" (1.96m) | 220 lb (100kg) | 2001-12-11 | South Carolina | 3 |
| G | 22 | (United States) | Clark, Caitlin | 6' 0" (1.83m) | 157 lb (71kg) | 2002-01-22 | Iowa | 2 |
| G/F | 8 | (United States) | Cunningham, Sophie (FA) | 6' 1" (1.85m) | 165 lb (75kg) | 1996-08-16 | Missouri | 7 |
| F/C | 12 | (Brazil) | Dantas, Damiris (injured) | 6' 4" (1.93m) | 214 lb (97kg) | 1992-11-17 | Brazil | 10 |
| G | 23 | (United States) | Hall, Bree | 6' 0" (1.83m) | 161 lb (73kg) | 2003-06-28 | South Carolina | 1 |
| G | 52 | (United States) | Harris, Tyasha (FA) | 5' 10" (1.78m) | 152 lb (69kg) | 1998-05-01 | South Carolina | 6 |
| F | 2 | (United States) | Hines-Allen, Myisha (FA) | 6' 2" (1.88m) | 200 lb (91kg) | 1995-05-30 | Louisville | 8 |
| G/F | 10 | (United States) | Hull, Lexie | 6' 2" (1.88m) | 155 lb (70kg) | 1999-09-13 | Stanford | 4 |
| G | 3 | (United States) | Johnson, Raven | 5' 8" (1.73m) | 167 lb (76kg) | 2003-03-04 | South Carolina | R |
| G | 0 | (United States) | Mitchell, Kelsey (FA) | 5' 8" (1.73m) | 155 lb (70kg) | 1995-11-12 | Ohio State | 8 |
| C | 1 | (United States) | Onyiah, Ugonne (FA) | 6' 3" (1.91m) | | 2002-03-12 | California | R |
| C | 5 | (United States) | Russell, Mercedes (FA) | 6' 6" (1.98m) | 195 lb (88kg) | 1995-07-27 | Tennessee | 8 |
| F/C | 21 | (United States) | Timpson, Makayla | 6' 2" (1.88m) | 173 lb (78kg) | 2002-09-20 | Florida State | 1 |
| F | 14 | (United States) | VanSlooten, Grace (FA) | 6' 3" (1.91m) | 180 lb (82kg) | 2004-06-16 | Michigan State | R |

Head coach
(United States) Stephanie White (Purdue)
Assistant coaches
(United States) Briann January (Arizona State)
(United States) Karima Christmas-Kelly (Duke)
(United States) Austin Kelly (Duke)

Legend

- (C) Team captain
- (DP) Unsigned draft pick
- (FA) Free agent
- (S) Suspended
- Injured

WNBA roster page

East
ATL
CHI
CON
IND
NY
TOR
WAS
West
DAL
GS
LV
LA
MIN
PHO
POR
SEA

=== Depth ===
| Pos. | Starter | Bench |
|---|---|---|
| PG | Caitlin Clark | Raven Johnson |
| SG | Kelsey Mitchell | Tyasha Harris |
| SF | Lexie Hull | Sophie Cunningham |
| PF | Monique Billings | Myisha Hines-Allen; Grace VanSlooten |
| C | Aliyah Boston | Makayla Timpson; Damiris Dantas |

== Schedule ==
=== Preseason ===
2026 pre-season game log
Total: 2–1 (Home: 1–1; Road: 1–0)
April / May: 2–1 (Home: 1–1; Road: 1–0)

| Game | Date | Team | Score | High points | High rebounds | High assists | Location Attendance | Record |
|---|---|---|---|---|---|---|---|---|
| 1 | April 25 | @ New York | W 109–91 | Mitchell, Walker-Kimbrough (18) | Monique Billings (7) | Raven Johnson (8) | Barclays Center; 14,662 | 1–0 |
| 2 | April 30 | Dallas | L 80–95 | Caitlin Clark (21) | Myisha Hines-Allen (7) | Raven Johnson (5) | Gainbridge Fieldhouse; 11,745 | 1–1 |
| 3 | May 2 | Nigeria | W 105–57 | Kelsey Mitchell (17) | Raven Johnson (7) | Aliyah Boston (6) | Gainbridge Fieldhouse; 10.051 | 2–1 |

2026 pre-season schedule

=== Regular season ===
2026 game log
Total: 28–16 (Home: 15–7; Road: 13–9)
May: 4–4 (Home: 3–2; Road: 1–2)

| Game | Date | Team | Score | High points | High rebounds | High assists | Location Attendance | Record |
|---|---|---|---|---|---|---|---|---|
| 1 | May 9 | Dallas | L 107–104 | Kelsey Mitchell (30) | Myisha Hines-Allen (6) | Caitlin Clark (7) | Gainbridge Fieldhouse; 17,274 | 0–1 |
| 2 | May 13 | @ Los Angeles | W 87–78 | Caitlin Clark (24) | Monique Billings (8) | Caitlin Clark (9) | Crypto.com Arena; 12,605 | 1–1 |
| 3 | May 15 | Washington | L 104–102 (OT) | Caitlin Clark (32) | Monique Billings (9) | Caitlin Clark (10) | Gainbridge Fieldhouse; 15,673 | 1–2 |
| 4 | May 17 | Seattle | W 89–78 | Caitlin Clark (21) | Caitlin Clark (7) | Caitlin Clark (10) | Gainbridge Fieldhouse; 14,505 | 2–2 |
| 5 | May 20 | Portland | W 90–73 | Aliyah Boston (24) | Boston, Hull (8) | Tyasha Harris (7) | Gainbridge Fieldhouse; 14,010 | 3–2 |
| 6 | May 22 | Golden State | W 90–82 | Caitlin Clark (22) | Aliyah Boston (16) | Caitlin Clark (9) | Gainbridge Fieldhouse; 16,742 | 4–2 |
| 7 | May 28 | @ Golden State | L 88–90 | Clark, Johnson (16) | Boston, Hull (6) | Caitlin Clark (6) | Chase Center; 18,064 | 4–3 |
| 8 | May 30 | @ Portland | L 84–100 | Aliyah Boston (24) | Aliyah Boston (7) | Caitlin Clark (6) | Moda Center; 19,347 | 4–4 |

June : 7–4 (Home: 5–2; Road: 2–2)

| Game | Date | Team | Score | High points | High rebounds | High assists | Location Attendance | Record |
|---|---|---|---|---|---|---|---|---|
| 9 | June 4 | Atlanta | W 83–71 | Kelsey Mitchell (25) | Boston, Clark, Hines-Allen (7) | Caitlin Clark (8) | Gainbridge Fieldhouse; 17,002 | 5–4 |
| 10 | June 6 | @ New York | L 75–83 | Kelsey Mitchell (21) | Aliyah Boston (9) | Caitlin Clark (9) | Barclays Center; 16,306 | 5–5 |
| 11 | June 8 | @ Washington | W 78–76 | Caitlin Clark (19) | Aliyah Boston (10) | Caitlin Clark (5) | CareFirst Arena; 4,200 | 6–5 |
| 12 | June 11 | Chicago | W 114–106 (OT) | Aliyah Boston (34) | Aliyah Boston (12) | Caitlin Clark (10) | Gainbridge Fieldhouse; 15,578 | 7–5 |
| 13 | June 13 | @ Connecticut | W 85–75 | Caitlin Clark (25) | Aliyah Boston (11) | Boston, Clark, Mitchell (5) | Mohegan Sun Arena; 8,910 | 8–5 |
| 14 | June 16 | Toronto | W 113–91 | Kelsey Mitchell (27) | Aliyah Boston (11) | Caitlin Clark (14) | Gainbridge Fieldhouse; 15,017 | 9–5 |
| 15 | June 18 | Atlanta | L 101–108 | Clark, Mitchell (26) | Aliyah Boston (8) | Caitlin Clark (7) | Gainbridge Fieldhouse; 17,274 | 9–6 |
| 16 | June 20 | @ Atlanta | L 96–113 | Caitlin Clark (26) | Aliyah Boston (9) | Caitlin Clark (7) | Gateway Center Arena; 17,044 | 9–7 |
| 17 | June 22 | Phoenix | W 86–77 | Caitlin Clark (24) | Monique Billings (10) | Caitlin Clark (9) | Gainbridge Fieldhouse; 15,198 | 10–7 |
| 18 | June 24 | Phoenix | L 109–111 | Kelsey Mitchell (30) | Aliyah Boston (9) | Caitlin Clark (8) | Gainbridge Fieldhouse; 16,128 | 10–8 |
| 19 | June 27 | Los Angeles | W 111–87 | Kelsey Mitchell (26) | Boston, Hull (7) | Raven Johnson (4) | Gainbridge Fieldhouse; 16,018 | 11–8 |

July : 8–2 (Home: 3–1; Road: 5–1)

| Game | Date | Team | Score | High points | High rebounds | High assists | Location Attendance | Record |
|---|---|---|---|---|---|---|---|---|
| 20 | July 5 | @ Las Vegas | W 84–68 | Kelsey Mitchell (27) | Aliyah Boston (10) | Tyasha Harris (5) | T-Mobile Arena; 17,796 | 12–8 |
| 21 | July 8 | @ Los Angeles | L 92–106 | Kelsey Mitchell (29) | Monique Billings (12) | Tyasha Harris (4) | Crypto.com Arena; 12,939 | 12–9 |
| 22 | July 9 | @ Phoenix | W 92–89 | Kelsey Mitchell (29) | Aliyah Boston (9) | Kelsey Mitchell (8) | Mortgage Matchup Center; 17,071 | 13–9 |
| 23 | July 12 | @ Las Vegas | W 109–75 | Kelsey Mitchell (27) | Aliyah Boston (11) | Caitlin Clark (6) | Michelob Ultra Arena; 10,513 | 14–9 |
| 24 | July 15 | Golden State | L 75–88 | Kelsey Mitchell (20) | Aliyah Boston (7) | Caitlin Clark (6) | Gainbridge Fieldhouse; 17,014 | 14–10 |
| 25 | July 17 | Seattle | W 110–107 | Caitlin Clark (45) | Makayla Timpson (9) | Caitlin Clark (10) | Gainbridge Fieldhouse; 17,274 | 15–10 |
| 26 | July 18 | New York | W 108–88 | Kelsey Mitchell (33) | Aliyah Boston (7) | Caitlin Clark (7) | Gainbridge Fieldhouse; 17,274 | 16–10 |
| 27 | July 22 | Connecticut | W 123–88 | Caitlin Clark (27) | Makayla Timpson (8) | Caitlin Clark (11) | Gainbridge Fieldhouse; 17,274 | 17–10 |
All-Star Game
| 28 | July 28 | @ Seattle | W 105–95 | Caitlin Clark (32) | Monique Billings (11) | Caitlin Clark (7) | Climate Pledge Arena; 18,343 | 18–10 |
| 29 | July 31 | @ Portland | W 112–98 | Clark, Mitchell (26) | Caitlin Clark (10) | Caitlin Clark (10) | Moda Center; 19,959 | 19–10 |

August: 7–4 (Home: 3–1; Road: 4–3)

| Game | Date | Team | Score | High points | High rebounds | High assists | Location Attendance | Record |
|---|---|---|---|---|---|---|---|---|
| 30 | August 2 | @ Minnesota | L 100–108 | Kelsey Mitchell (37) | Aliyah Boston (8) | Caitlin Clark (10) | Target Center; 16,505 | 19–11 |
| 31 | August 6 | Las Vegas | L 84–86 (OT) | Kelsey Mitchell (28) | Aliyah Boston (12) | Caitlin Clark (8) | Gainbridge Fieldhouse; 17,274 | 19–12 |
| 32 | August 8 | @ Chicago | W 90–86 | Kelsey Mitchell (27) | Aliyah Boston (11) | Caitlin Clark (11) | United Center; 16,065 | 20–12 |
| 33 | August 11 | New York | W 106–92 | Kelsey Mitchell (28) | Boston, Timpson (7) | Caitlin Clark (10) | Gainbridge Fieldhouse; 16,507 | 21–12 |
| 34 | August 14 | Dallas | W 98–87 | Caitlin Clark (29) | Aliyah Boston (10) | Caitlin Clark (10) | Gainbridge Fieldhouse; 17,274 | 22–12 |
| 35 | August 16 | @ Atlanta | W 95–91 (OT) | Caitlin Clark (26) | Aliyah Boston (14) | Caitlin Clark (9) | State Farm Arena; 17,044 | 23–12 |
| 36 | August 18 | @ Toronto | W 101–95 | Kelsey Mitchell (29) | Makayla Timpson (7) | Caitlin Clark (7) | Scotiabank Arena; 19,300 | 24–12 |
| 37 | August 20 | @ Dallas | L 85–91 | Kelsey Mitchell (37) | Makayla Timpson (12) | Caitlin Clark (9) | American Airlines Center; 20,297 | 24–13 |
| 38 | August 22 | @ New York | L 102–109 | Kelsey Mitchell (25) | Myisha Hines-Allen (7) | Caitlin Clark (7) | Barclays Center; 17,581 | 24–14 |
| 39 | August 23 | @ Chicago | W 113–90 | Caitlin Clark (37) | Makayla Timpson (9) | Caitlin Clark (10) | Wintrust Arena; 9,248 | 25–14 |
| 40 | August 28 | Connecticut | W 111–91 | Clark, Mitchell (34) | Makayla Timpson (8) | Caitlin Clark (12) | Gainbridge Fieldhouse; 17,274 | 26–14 |

September : 2–2 (Home: 1–1; Road: 1–1)

| Game | Date | Team | Score | High points | High rebounds | High assists | Location Attendance | Record |
|---|---|---|---|---|---|---|---|---|
| 41 | September 18 | @ Toronto | W 103–85 | Kelsey Mitchell (33) | Myisha Hines-Allen (7) | Caitlin Clark (14) | Coca-Cola Coliseum; 8,210 | 27–14 |
| 42 | September 20 | Washington | L 77–93 | Caitlin Clark (25) | Makayla Timpson (7) | Boston, Clark (5) | Gainbridge Fieldhouse; 17,274 | 27–15 |
| 43 | September 22 | Minnesota | W 96–77 | Caitlin Clark (27) | Boston, Clark, Timpson (7) | Caitlin Clark (9) | Gainbridge Fieldhouse; 17,274 | 28–15 |
| 44 | September 24 | @ Minnesota | L 66–86 | Kelsey Mitchell (10) | Monique Billings (10) | Raven Johnson (4) | Target Center; 15,221 | 28–16 |

2026 season schedule

Notes:

- Games highlighted in represent Commissioner's Cup games.

=== Playoffs ===
2026 playoff game log
First Round vs. Las Vegas Aces
Lost Series 1–2

| Game | Date | Team | Score | High points | High rebounds | High assists | Location Attendance | Series |
|---|---|---|---|---|---|---|---|---|
| 1 | September 27 | @ Las Vegas | L 85–102 | Aliyah Boston (18) | Aliyah Boston (8) | Caitlin Clark (10) | Michelob Ultra Arena; 10,207 | 0–1 |
| 2 | September 29 | Las Vegas | W 99–89 | Caitlin Clark (27) | Clark, Hull (7) | Caitlin Clark (15) | Gainbridge Fieldhouse; 16,298 | 1–1 |
| 3 | October 1 | @ Las Vegas | L 83–94 | Kelsey Mitchell (23) | Myisha Hines-Allen (12) | Caitlin Clark (4) | Michelob Ultra Arena; 10,388 | 1–2 |

2026 playoff schedule

== Standings ==
| # | Team | W | L | PCT | GB | Conf. | Home | Road | Cup |
|---|---|---|---|---|---|---|---|---|---|
| 1 | y — Minnesota Lynx | 33 | 11 | .750 | – | 20–3 | 15–7 | 18–4 | 6–1 |
| 2 | x — Golden State Valkyries | 32 | 12 | .727 | 1 | 15–8 | 17–5 | 15–7 | 5–2 |
| 3 | x — Las Vegas Aces | 31 | 13 | .705 | 2 | 17–6 | 15–7 | 16–6 | 6–1 |
| 4 | x — Atlanta Dream | 30 | 14 | .682 | 3 | 15–5 | 15–7 | 15–7 | 4–2 |
| 5 | x — Washington Mystics | 28 | 16 | .636 | 5 | 15–5 | 15–7 | 13–9 | 3–3 |
| 6 | x — Indiana Fever | 28 | 16 | .636 | 5 | 14–6 | 15–7 | 13–9 | 5–1 |
| 7 | x — Dallas Wings | 27 | 17 | .614 | 6 | 13–10 | 16–6 | 11–11 | 4–3 |
| 8 | cx – New York Liberty | 26 | 18 | .591 | 7 | 13–7 | 14–8 | 12–10 | 6–0 |
| 9 | e — Portland Fire | 17 | 27 | .386 | 16 | 7–16 | 9–13 | 8–14 | 2–5 |
| 10 | e — Phoenix Mercury | 16 | 28 | .364 | 17 | 10–13 | 7–15 | 9–13 | 2–5 |
| 11 | e — Chicago Sky | 16 | 28 | .364 | 17 | 4–16 | 11–11 | 5–17 | 1–5 |
| 12 | e — Los Angeles Sparks | 16 | 28 | .364 | 17 | 9–14 | 8–14 | 8–14 | 3–4 |
| 13 | e — Toronto Tempo | 11 | 33 | .250 | 22 | 5–15 | 7–15 | 4–18 | 2–4 |
| 14 | e — Connecticut Sun | 11 | 33 | .250 | 22 | 4–16 | 8–14 | 3–19 | 0–6 |
| 15 | e — Seattle Storm | 8 | 36 | .182 | 25 | 1–22 | 6–16 | 2–20 | 0–7 |

Notes

(#) – League Standing
c – Commissioner's Cup winner
y – Regular season champion
x – Clinched playoff berth
e – Eliminated from playoff contention
Source: Overall standings and Commissioner's Cup Standings

== Playoffs ==
**First round** Best-of-3
1 | Minnesota Lynx | 0
8 | **New York Liberty** | **2**
4 | **Atlanta Dream** | **2**
5 | Washington Mystics | 0
2 | **Golden State Valkyries** | **2**
7 | Dallas Wings | 1
3 | **Las Vegas Aces** | **2**
6 | Indiana Fever | 1

**Semifinals**; Best-of-5
8 | New York Liberty | 0
4 | **Atlanta Dream** | **3**
2 | **Golden State Valkyries** | **3**
3 | Las Vegas Aces | 0

**Finals**; Best-of-7
4 | Atlanta Dream | 3
2 | **Golden State Valkyries** | **4**

- **Bold** – Series winner
- Italic – Team with home-court-advantage

== Standings ==
| # | Team | W | L | PCT | GB | Conf. | Home | Road | Cup |
|---|---|---|---|---|---|---|---|---|---|
| 1 | **y** — Minnesota Lynx | 33 | 11 | .750 | – | 20–3 | 15–7 | 18–4 | 6–1 |
| 2 | **x** — Golden State Valkyries | 32 | 12 | .727 | 1 | 15–8 | 17–5 | 15–7 | 5–2 |
| 3 | **x** — Las Vegas Aces | 31 | 13 | .705 | 2 | 17–6 | 15–7 | 16–6 | 6–1 |
| 4 | **x** — Atlanta Dream | 30 | 14 | .682 | 3 | 15–5 | 15–7 | 15–7 | 4–2 |
| 5 | **x** — Washington Mystics | 28 | 16 | .636 | 5 | 15–5 | 15–7 | 13–9 | 3–3 |
| 6 | **x** — Indiana Fever | 28 | 16 | .636 | 5 | 14–6 | 15–7 | 13–9 | 5–1 |
| 7 | **x** — Dallas Wings | 27 | 17 | .614 | 6 | 13–10 | 16–6 | 11–11 | 4–3 |
| 8 | **cx** – New York Liberty | 26 | 18 | .591 | 7 | 13–7 | 14–8 | 12–10 | 6–0 |
| 9 | **e** — Portland Fire | 17 | 27 | .386 | 16 | 7–16 | 9–13 | 8–14 | 2–5 |
| 10 | **e** — Phoenix Mercury | 16 | 28 | .364 | 17 | 10–13 | 7–15 | 9–13 | 2–5 |
| 11 | **e** — Chicago Sky | 16 | 28 | .364 | 17 | 4–16 | 11–11 | 5–17 | 1–5 |
| 12 | **e** — Los Angeles Sparks | 16 | 28 | .364 | 17 | 9–14 | 8–14 | 8–14 | 3–4 |
| 13 | **e** — Toronto Tempo | 11 | 33 | .250 | 22 | 5–15 | 7–15 | 4–18 | 2–4 |
| 14 | **e** — Connecticut Sun | 11 | 33 | .250 | 22 | 4–16 | 8–14 | 3–19 | 0–6 |
| 15 | **e** — Seattle Storm | 8 | 36 | .182 | 25 | 1–22 | 6–16 | 2–20 | 0–7 |

Notes

(#) – League Standing
c – Commissioner's Cup winner
y – Regular season champion
x – Clinched playoff berth
e – Eliminated from playoff contention
Source: Overall standings and Commissioner's Cup Standings

== Awards and honors ==
| Recipient | Award | Date awarded | Ref. |
|---|---|---|---|
| Aliyah Boston | WNBA All-Star Starter | July 2 | |
| Caitlin Clark | Eastern Conference Player of the Week | June 16 | |
| Caitlin Clark | Eastern Conference Player of the Week | July 21 | |
| Caitlin Clark | Eastern Conference Player of the Week | August 4 | |
| Caitlin Clark | Eastern Conference Player of the Week | August 18 | |
| Caitlin Clark | WNBA All-Star Starter | July 2 | |
| Caitlin Clark | Eastern Conference Player of the Month – June | July 3 | |
| Caitlin Clark | AP Player of the Week | July 21 | |
| Caitlin Clark | AP Player of the Week | August 17 | |
| Kelsey Mitchell | WNBA All-Star Starter | July 2 | |
| Kelsey Mitchell | Eastern Conference Player of the Week | July 14 | |
| Kelsey Mitchell | Eastern Conference Player of the Month – July | August 3 | |
| Stephanie White | Coach of the Month – July | August 5 | |
