= 2026 WNBA Commissioner's Cup =

2026 WNBA Commissioner's Cup Game
Las Vegas Aces	New York Liberty
(6–1)	(6–0)
85	93
Head coach: Becky Hammon	Head coach: Chris DeMarco
	1	2	3	4	Total
Las Vegas Aces	21	16	25	23	85
New York Liberty	27	24	14	28	93
- Date: Regular Season: June 1–17, 2026; Championship: June 30, 2026
- Venue: Local WNBA Arenas (Regular Season); Barclays Center (Championship)
- MVP: Breanna Stewart
- Attendance: 15,112

United States TV coverage
- Network: Prime Video

The 2026 WNBA Commissioner's Cup (known for sponsorship reasons as the 2026 WNBA Commissioner's Cup presented by Coinbase) is the WNBA's sixth Commissioner's Cup in league history. The Cup featuring a transition away from the thirteen-game format to a six-game format in the Eastern Conference and seven-game format in the Western Conference, with seven teams in the Eastern Conference and eight in the Western Conference. The best team in cup play from each conference faced off in a championship game.

== Format ==
The team with the best record in cup games from each conference played in the championship game against each other, with the team having the best record hosting the game. This was the third season utilizing the single round-robin format. All games were played between June 1 and June 17, 2026.

== Funding to local non-profits ==
Each team selects a charity of their choice to represent, and support throughout the Commissioner's Cup series.

Team	Charity	Donation Total
Atlanta Dream	The King Center	$14,000
Chicago Sky	Girls in the Game	$8,000
Connecticut Sun	United Way of Southeastern Connecticut	$6,000
Dallas Wings	Young Leaders, Strong City	$15,000
Golden State Valkyries	Youth Uprising	$17,000
Indiana Fever	Coburn Place	$16,000
Las Vegas Aces	Public Education Foundation	$24,000
Los Angeles Sparks	Brotherhood Crusade	$13,000
Minnesota Lynx	Women's Foundation of Minnesota	$19,000
New York Liberty	African American Policy Forum	$28,000
Phoenix Mercury	Chicanos Por La Causa	$11,000
Portland Fire	Black Parent Initiative	$11,000
Seattle Storm	King County Library System Foundation	$7,000
Toronto Tempo	Lay-Up	$10,000
Washington Mystics	Ben's Chili Bowl Foundation	$12,000

== Standings ==
Eastern Conference

Pos	Team	Pld	W	L	PF	PA	PD	GB	Qualification	NYL	IND	ATL	WAS	TOR	CHI	CON
1	New York Liberty	6	6	0	555	486	+69	—	Advance to Championship Game	—	83–75	104–90	86–64	97–82	96–95	89–80
2	Indiana Fever	6	5	1	548	502	+46	1		75–83	—	83–71	78–76	113–91	114–106	85–75
3	Atlanta Dream	6	4	2	545	491	+54	2		90–104	71–83	—	109–77	102–77	82–75	91–75
4	Washington Mystics	6	3	3	481	511	−30	3		64–86	76–78	77–109	—	86–85	90–72	88–81
5	Toronto Tempo	6	2	4	526	568	−42	4		82–97	91–113	77–102	85–86	—	85–68	106–102
6	Chicago Sky	6	1	5	501	547	−46	5		95–96	106–114	75–82	72–90	68–85	—	85–80
7	Connecticut Sun	6	0	6	493	544	−51	6		80–89	75–85	75–91	81–88	102–106	80–85	—

Updated to match(es) played on June 17, 2026. Source: WNBA

Western Conference

Pos	Team	Pld	W	L	PF	PA	PD	GB	Qualification	LVA	MIN	GSV	DAL	LAS	PHX	PDX	SEA
1	Las Vegas Aces	7	6	1	621	597	+24	—	Advance to Championship Game	—	100–97	84–79	66–96	79–69	86–76	105–89	101–91
2	Minnesota Lynx	7	6	1	689	562	+127	—		97–100	—	87–84	100–76	99–83	111–77	107–74	88–68
3	Golden State Valkyries	7	5	2	590	539	+51	1		79–84	84–87	—	91–80	78–58	87–81	95–77	76–72
4	Dallas Wings	7	4	3	603	563	+40	2		96–66	76–100	80–91	—	104–96	85–70	83–84	79–56
5	Los Angeles Sparks	7	3	4	594	617	−23	3		69–79	83–99	58–78	96–104	—	111–102	89–72	88–83
6	Phoenix Mercury	7	2	5	556	620	−64	4		76–86	77–111	81–87	70–85	102–111	—	78–72	72–68
7	Portland Fire	7	2	5	562	646	−84	4		89–105	74–107	77–95	84–83	72–89	72–78	—	94–89
8	Seattle Storm	7	0	7	527	598	−71	6		91–101	68–88	72–76	56–79	83–88	68–72	89–94	—

Updated to match(es) played on June 17, 2026. Source: WNBA

== Championship game summary ==
Prime Video

June 30, 2026
7:00 p.m. EDT

Report

Las Vegas Aces 85, New York Liberty 93
Scoring by quarter: 21–27, 16–24, 25–14, 23–28
Pts: Jackie Young (31); Rebs: Cheyenne Parker-Tyus (8); Asts: J. Young and C. Gray (7)	Pts: Sabrina Ionescu (26); Rebs: Breanna Stewart (11); Asts: Sabrina Ionescu (5)

Barclays Center, New York City, New York
Attendance: 15,112
Referees: Tim Greene, Tiara Cruse, Isaac Barnett

== Team rosters ==
=== Las Vegas Aces ===
2026 Las Vegas Aces roster
Players
Coaches

Pos.	No.	Nat.	Name	Height	Weight	DOB	From	Yrs
F	2	(United States)	Barker, Janiah (injured)	6' 4" (1.93m)	185 lb (84kg)	2003-11-08	Tennessee	R
F	1	(United States)	Bell, Kierstan	6' 1" (1.85m)	176 lb (80kg)	2000-03-16	Florida Gulf Coast	3
G	23	(United States)	Carter, Chennedy	5' 9" (1.75m)	143 lb (65kg)	1998-11-14	Texas A&M	4
G	11	(United States)	Evans, Dana (injured)	5' 6" (1.68m)	145 lb (66kg)	1998-08-01	Louisville	4
G	12	(United States)	Gray, Chelsea	5' 11" (1.8m)	170 lb (77kg)	1992-10-08	Duke	10
G	24	(United States)	Loyd, Jewell	5' 11" (1.8m)	175 lb (79kg)	1993-10-05	Notre Dame	10
F	32	(United States)	Parker-Tyus, Cheyenne	6' 4" (1.93m)	193 lb (88kg)	1992-08-22	Middle Tennessee	10
F	3	(United States)	Smith, NaLyssa	6' 4" (1.93m)	185 lb (84kg)	2000-08-08	Baylor	3
F	7	(Australia)	Talbot, Stephanie	6' 2" (1.88m)	192 lb (87kg)	1994-06-15	Australia	6
F/C	21	(United States)	Turner, Brianna	6' 3" (1.91m)	175 lb (79kg)	1996-07-05	Notre Dame	6
C	22	(United States)	Wilson, A'ja (injured)	6' 4" (1.93m)	195 lb (88kg)	1996-08-08	South Carolina	7
G	0	(United States)	Young, Jackie	6' 0" (1.83m)	165 lb (75kg)	1997-09-16	Notre Dame	6

Head coach
(United States) Becky Hammon (Colorado State)
Assistant coaches
(United States) Tyrone Ellis (Southern Nazarene)
(United States) Nola Henry (College of Charleston)
(United States) Larry Lewis (Morehouse)
(United States) Charlene Thomas-Swinson (Auburn)
Athletic trainer
(United States) Bryson Creer (BYU)

Legend

- (C) Team captain
- (DP) Unsigned draft pick
- (FA) Free agent
- (S) Suspended
- Injured

=== New York Liberty ===
2026 New York Liberty roster
Players
Coaches

Pos.	No.	Nat.	Name	Height	Weight	DOB	From	Yrs
G/F	9	(Australia)	Allen, Rebecca	6' 2" (1.88m)	162 lb (73kg)	1992-11-06	Australia	9
G	18	(France)	Astier, Pauline	5' 10" (1.78m)		2002-02-15	France	R
F/C	14	(Spain)	Carrera, Raquel	6' 3" (1.91m)		2001-10-31	Spain	R
G	4	(France)	Fauthoux, Marine (injured)	5' 9" (1.75m)		2001-01-23	France	R
F	13	(Germany)	Fiebich, Leonie	6' 4" (1.93m)		2000-01-10	Germany	2
G	7	(United States)	Gardner, Rebekah	6' 1" (1.85m)	130 lb (59kg)	1990-07-09	UCLA	2
G	20	(United States)	Ionescu, Sabrina	5' 11" (1.8m)	165 lb (75kg)	1997-12-06	Oregon	5
G	23	(France)	Johannès, Marine	5' 10" (1.78m)	134 lb (61kg)	1995-01-21	France	3
C	35	(The Bahamas)	Jones, Jonquel	6' 6" (1.98m)	215 lb (98kg)	1994-01-05	George Washington	8
G/F	44	(United States)	Laney-Hamilton, Betnijah	6' 0" (1.83m)	166 lb (75kg)	1993-10-29	Rutgers	9
F	–	(Australia)	Maley, Anneli (injured)	6' 1" (1.85m)		1998-09-01	TCU	2
F	0	(Germany)	Sabally, Satou (injured)	6' 4" (1.93m)	175 lb (79kg)	1998-04-25	Oregon	5
F	30	(United States)	Stewart, Breanna	6' 4" (1.93m)	170 lb (77kg)	1994-08-27	Connecticut	8
C	21	(China)	Han Xu	6' 11" (2.11m)	203 lb (92kg)	1999-10-31	China	3

Head coach
(United States) Chris DeMarco (Dominican (CA))
Assistant coaches
(United States) Courtney Paris (Oklahoma)
(United States) Will Sheehey (Indiana)
(United States) Andrew Wade (Catholic)
(United States) Addi Walters (Stetson)
Player development
(United States) Kristen Mann (UC Santa Barbara)
Strength and conditioning coach
(United States) Emily Zaler (Concordia University Chicago)

Legend

- (C) Team captain
- (DP) Unsigned draft pick
- (FA) Free agent
- (S) Suspended
- Injured

Preceded by Indiana Fever	WNBA Commissioner's Cup Champions; New York Liberty; 2026	Most recent
