= Addi Walters =

American basketball player and coach (born 1996)

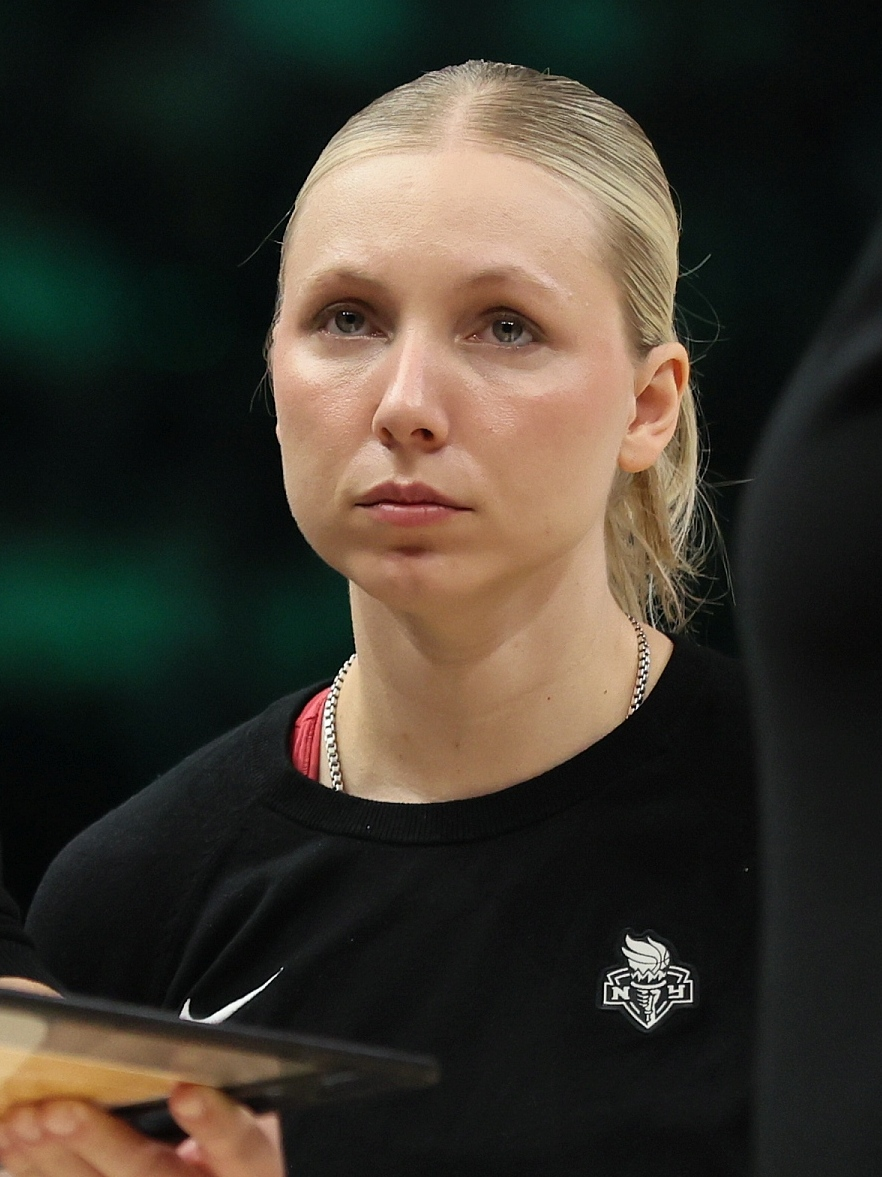
- Walters with the New York Liberty in 2026

New York Liberty
- Position: Assistant coach
- League: WNBA

Personal information
- Born: November 6, 1996 (age 30)
- Listed height: 5 ft 9 in (1.75 m)

Career information
- High school: St. Ignatius College Preparatory
- College: Cal State Bakersfield (2015–2017); Stetson (2017–2019); Santa Clara (2019–2020)
- Coaching career: 2024–present

Career history

Coaching
- 2024–present: Bahamas (assistant)
- 2025–2026: Iowa Wolves (assistant)
- 2026–present: New York Liberty (assistant)

Career highlights
- WNBA Commissioner's Cup Champion (2026)

Addison Walters (born November 6, 1996) is an American professional basketball coach who is an assistant coach of the New York Liberty in the Women's National Basketball Association (WNBA) and the Bahamas men's national basketball team.

== Career ==
Originally from San Francisco, Walters played four seasons of Division I collegiate basketball. She played for two seasons at Cal State Bakersfield (2015–2017) before transferring to Stetson University for two years; she had one redshirt season before competing in the 2018–2019 season. She played at Santa Clara University as a fifth year senior.

Walters began her coaching career with the Minnesota Timberwolves organization. She was first hired in 2020 as a basketball operations associate for their G League affiliate, the Iowa Wolves. She subsequently worked as the head video coordinator for the Timberwolves before rejoining the Iowa Wolves staff as an associate head coach in 2025.

Walters has worked as an assistant coach for the Bahamas men's national basketball team, with whom she coached under future-Liberty head coach Chris DeMarco.

== Personal life ==
She is the daughter of Rex Walters, a former NBA player and professional basketball coach.
