= WNBA Commissioner's Cup =

In-season competition

- Current season, competition or edition: 2026 WNBA Commissioner's Cup
- Sport: Basketball
- Founded: 2020
- Organising body: Women's National Basketball Association
- No. of teams: 15
- Country: United States of America
- Continent: North America
- Most recent champion: New York Liberty (2nd title)
- Most titles: New York Liberty (2 titles)
- Broadcaster: Amazon Prime Video

The WNBA Commissioner's Cup, known for sponsorship reasons as the WNBA Commissioner's Cup Presented By Coinbase, is an in-season competition of the Women's National Basketball Association (WNBA) that begins at the start of the regular season and continues throughout the first half of the season. The final is played between the top teams from the Eastern Conference and the Western Conference. A total of 60 regular-season contests involving all 15 teams count toward the Cup standings.

The Commissioner's Cup was originally scheduled to begin in the 2020 WNBA season, but due to the COVID-19 pandemic, the Cup was first awarded in the 2021 season.

In October 2021, the WNBA announced that Coinbase had acquired the naming rights to the Cup starting with the 2022 tournament.

== Format ==
The Commissioner's Cup consists of regular-season games designated to count toward Cup play. The team from each conference with the top record in designated "Cup games" will then compete for the Commissioner's Cup title and a special prize pool. Beginning in 2024, Cup games are a series of home or road games against its five conference rivals. From 2021 to 2023, Cup games were the first home game and first road game each team plays against its five conference rivals. The Cup restores the Eastern–Western Conference rivalry that WNBA used in its playoff tournament until the 2015 WNBA Playoffs.

The first Commissioner's Cup Final game was held at Footprint Center in Phoenix, Arizona.

== Prize ==
The total compensation tops out at $500,000, with the winning team making around $30,000 per player and the game's MVP taking home an additional $5,000. On the losing team's side, players earn $10,000 each.

The winning team also receives the Commissioner's Cup Trophy.

== History ==
New York Liberty were the first team to win the tournament twice, 2023 and 2026.

| Year | Winner | Result | Runner-up | Cup MVP |
|---|---|---|---|---|
| 2021 | Seattle Storm | 79–57 | Connecticut Sun | Breanna Stewart |
| 2022 | Las Vegas Aces | 93–83 | Chicago Sky | Chelsea Gray |
| 2023 | New York Liberty | 82–63 | Las Vegas Aces | Jonquel Jones |
| 2024 | Minnesota Lynx | 94–89 | New York Liberty | Napheesa Collier |
| 2025 | Indiana Fever | 74–59 | Minnesota Lynx | Natasha Howard |
| 2026 | New York Liberty | 93–85 | Las Vegas Aces | Breanna Stewart |

== Final appearances ==
Statistics for cumulative annual finals wins and losses, not Commissioner's Cup qualifying games.

| Apps | Team | Wins | Losses | Pct | Year(s) won | Year(s) lost |
|---|---|---|---|---|---|---|
| 3 | New York Liberty | 2 | 1 | .667 | 2023, 2026 | 2024 |
| 3 | Las Vegas Aces | 1 | 2 | .333 | 2022 | 2023, 2026 |
| 2 | Minnesota Lynx | 1 | 1 | .500 | 2024 | 2025 |
| 1 | Indiana Fever | 1 | 0 | 1.000 | 2025 | — |
| 1 | Seattle Storm | 1 | 0 | 1.000 | 2021 | — |
| 1 | Connecticut Sun | 0 | 1 | .000 | — | 2021 |
| 1 | Chicago Sky | 0 | 1 | .000 | — | 2022 |

== Cup final records ==
This table shows a list of records through the history of the Commissioner's Cup final.

Cup records
| Milestone | Player | Team | Date | Information |
|---|---|---|---|---|
| Points, individual | Jackie Young | Las Vegas Aces | June 30, 2026 | 31 points |
| Rebounds, individual | A'ja Wilson | Las Vegas Aces | July 26, 2022 | 17 rebounds |
| Assists, individual | Courtney Vandersloot | New York Liberty | August 15, 2023 | 10 assists |
| Steals, individual | Breanna Stewart | Seattle Storm | August 12, 2021 | 4 steals |
| Blocks, individual | A'ja Wilson | Las Vegas Aces | July 26, 2022 | 6 blocks |
| Points, team | —N/a | Minnesota Lynx | June 25, 2024 | 94 points vs. New York |
| Rebounds, team | —N/a | New York Liberty | June 30, 2026 | 51 rebounds vs. Las Vegas |
| Assists, team | —N/a | Minnesota Lynx | June 25, 2024 | 26 assists vs. New York |
| Steals, team | —N/a | Seattle Storm | August 12, 2021 | 14 steals vs. Connecticut |
| Blocks, team | —N/a | Las Vegas Aces | July 26, 2022 | 9 blocks vs. Chicago |
| Career wins, coach | Noelle Quinn; Becky Hammon; Sandy Brondello; Cheryl Reeve; Stephanie White; Chris DeMarco | Seattle Storm; Las Vegas Aces; New York Liberty; Minnesota Lynx; Indiana Fever; New York Liberty | 2021; 2022; 2023; 2024; 2025; 2026 | 1 win |
| Career wins, player | Breanna Stewart | Seattle Storm; New York Liberty | 2021; 2023; 2026 | 3 wins |
| Margin of victory | —N/a | Seattle Storm | August 12, 2021 | 22-point win (79–57) over Connecticut |
| Attendance, one game | —N/a | Target Center; Minnesota Lynx (Host City) | July 1, 2025 | 12,778 |

== See also ==
- NBA Cup
