= Puoch =

Puoch is a surname. Notable people with the surname include:

- Nyadiew Puoch (born 2004), Australian basketball player
- Simon Kun Puoch, South Sudanese lieutenant general and politician
