= List of NCAA Division I women's basketball career 3-point scoring leaders =

A three-point field goal (also known as a "three-pointer" or "3-pointer") is a field goal in a basketball game, made from beyond the three-point line, a designated arc radiating from the basket. A successful attempt is worth three points, in contrast to the two points awarded for shots made inside the three-point line. The members on this list are the top 25 in 3-point field goals made in National Collegiate Athletic Association (NCAA) Division I women's competition. The statistic was first recognized in the 1987–88 season, when 3-point field goals were officially instituted by the NCAA for women's play. From the 1987–88 season through the 2007–08 season, the three-point perimeter was marked at 19 ft 9 in (6.02 m) for both men's and women's college basketball. On May 3, 2007, the NCAA men's basketball rules committee passed a measure to extend the distance of the men's three-point line back to 20 ft 9 in (6.32 m); the women's line remained at the original distance until it was moved to match the then-current men's distance effective in 2011–12. On June 5, 2019, the NCAA men's rules committee voted to extend the men's three-point line to the FIBA distance of 6.75 meters (22 ft 2 in), effective in 2019–20 in Division I and 2020–21 in lower NCAA divisions. The women's line remained at 20 ft 9 in until being moved to the FIBA arc in 2021–22.

Through the 2023–24 season, Caitlin Clark holds the records for career threes and three-point attempts, having made 548 from 1,452 attempts during her career at Iowa from 2020 to 2024.

Ten players on this list played in more than the standard four seasons due to benefiting from the NCAA's blanket COVID-19 eligibility waiver for players active in the 2020–21 season—Taylor Robertson, Kendall Spray, Katie Benzan, Ioanna Krimili, Dyaisha Fair, Taycee Wedin, Taylor Mikesell, Aisha Sheppard, Georgia Amoore, and Aaliyah Nye. All played in five seasons except for Krimili, who played in six. She qualified for a so-called "medical redshirt" due to a season-ending injury early in her 2019–20 freshman season at San Francisco.

Seven players on this list split their collegiate careers between two or more schools. Spray played at UT Martin, Clemson, and Florida Gulf Coast. Benzan played at Harvard and Maryland. Krimili played at San Francisco and California. Fair played at Buffalo and Syracuse. Mikesell also played at Maryland before transferring to Oregon and later Ohio State. Amoore played at Virginia Tech and Kentucky. Nye played at Illinois and Alabama.

The player with the highest three-point percentage for her career on this list is Kaleena Mosqueda-Lewis of UConn at 44.7%, while Shrieka Evans of Grambling has the lowest at 31.9%.

Five programs have placed two players in the all-time top 25—Ohio State with Mitchell and Mikesell, Idaho with Taylor Pierce and Mikayla Ferenz, UT Martin with Spray and Heather Butler, Maryland with Benzan and Mikesell, and Virginia Tech with Sheppard and Amoore.

== Key ==
Pos.	G	F	C	3PM	3PA	3P%	Ref.
Position	Guard	Forward	Center	3-pointers made	3-pointers attempted	3-point field goal %	References

*	Inducted into the Naismith Memorial Basketball Hall of Fame
Team (X)	Denotes the number of times a player from that team appears on the list
C	Player was active in the 2020–21 season and benefited from the NCAA's blanket COVID-19 eligibility waiver

== Top 25 3-point field goal leaders ==
Current through the end of the 2025–26 season.

Player	Pos.	Team	Games played	Career start	Career end	3PM	3PA	3P%	Ref.
Caitlin Clark (Note: Clark was eligible to play in a fifth season in 2024–25 due to the COVID waiver, but chose to declare for the 2024 WNBA draft.)	G	Iowa	139	2020	2024	548	1452	37.7	
Taylor Robertson^{C}	G	Oklahoma	151	2018	2023	537	1221	44.0	
Kelsey Mitchell	G	Ohio State	139	2014	2018	497	1286	38.6	
Taylor Pierce	G	Idaho	135	2015	2019	472	1194	39.5	
Jess Kovatch	G	Saint Francis (PA)	130	2015	2019	472	1284	36.8	
Kendall Spray^{C}	G	UT Martin / Clemson / Florida Gulf Coast	153	2016	2022 (Note: Spray's college career spanned six seasons, but she only played in five. After playing her first two seasons at UT Martin, she transferred to Clemson, sitting out the 2018–19 season due to then-current NCAA transfer rules. Following two seasons of play at Clemson, she took advantage of the COVID-19 waiver and changes to NCAA transfer rules to transfer to Florida Gulf Coast for her final college season.)	466	1166	40.0	
Taylor Mikesell^{C}	G	Maryland / Oregon / Ohio State (2)	158	2018	2023	454	1080	42.0	
Katie Benzan^{C}	G	Harvard / Maryland (2)	147	2016	2022 (Note: Benzan's college career spanned six seasons, but she only played in five. After playing three seasons at Harvard, she transferred to Maryland, sitting out the 2019–20 season due to then-current NCAA transfer rules. The COVID-19 waiver enabled her to play two seasons at Maryland instead of the standard one.)	453	1075	42.1	
Ioanna Krimili^{C}	G	San Francisco / California	158	2019	2025	434	1114	39.0	
Dyaisha Fair^{C}	G	Buffalo / Syracuse	153	2019	2024	430	1227	35.0	
Darby Maggard	G	Belmont	134	2015	2019	429	997	43.1	
Rachael Childress	G	UAB	128	2016	2020	415	978	42.4	
Mikayla Ferenz	G	Idaho (2)	135	2015	2019	415	1082	38.4	
Katelynn Flaherty	G	Michigan	140	2014	2018	410	1045	39.2	
Georgia Amoore^{C}	G	Virginia Tech / Kentucky	157	2020	2025	408	1147	35.6	
Taycee Wedin^{C}	G	Saint Mary's	143	2018	2023	407	972	41.9	
Presley Hudson	G	Central Michigan	135	2015	2019	407	1062	38.3	
Aisha Sheppard^{C}	G	Virginia Tech (2)	159	2017	2022	402	1080	37.2	
Kaleena Mosqueda-Lewis	G	UConn	142	2011	2015	398	890	44.7	
Laurie Koehn	G	Kansas State	121	2001	2005	392	942	41.6	
Heather Butler	G	UT Martin (2)	129	2010	2014	392	1074	36.5	
Shrieka Evans	G	Grambling	117	1999	2003	392	1228	31.9	
Erin Thorn	G	BYU	117	1999	2003	391	949	41.2	
Aaliyah Nye^{C}	G	Illinois / Alabama	142	2020	2025	389	931	41.8	
Jaleesa Ross	G	Fresno State	125	2007	2011	389	968	40.2	
