= Manuela Puoch =

Australian basketball player

No. 32 – Dandenong Rangers
- Position: Forward
- League: NBL1 South

Personal information
- Born: 5 October 2006 (age 20) Melbourne, Australia
- Listed height: 6 ft 1 in (1.85 m)

Career information
- WNBA draft: 2026: 3rd round, 41st overall pick
- Drafted by: New York Liberty
- Playing career: 2024–present

Career history
- 2024–present: Dandenong Rangers
- 2025–2026: Southside Melbourne Flyers
- Stats at Basketball Reference
Medals
Women's basketball
Representing Australia
FIBA Under-19 World Cup
Silver medal – second place	2025 Czech Republic	Team

Manuela Puoch (born 5 October 2006) is an Australian professional basketball player for the UC Capitals of the WNBL. She helped the Australian Gems win silver at the 2025 FIBA Under-19 World Cup. She was drafted 41st overall by the New York Liberty in the 2026 WNBA draft.

== Playing career ==
Puoch signed with the Dandenong Rangers of the NBL1 South in 2024, and averaged 12.8 points, 6.9 rebounds, and 1.9 assists per game during her debut season. She joined the Southside Melbourne Flyers of the WNBL for the 2025–26 WNBL season, and averaged 4.4 points, and 1.3 rebounds per game in 23 games. While playing with the Southside Flyers, she faced her sister, Nyadiew, during the 2025 WNBL season opener against the Canberra Capitals on 18 October 2025. She returned to Dandenong for the 2026 NBL1 South season and appeared in two NBL1 games for the Rangers, where she averaged 14 points, eight rebounds and 1.5 steals per game

On 14 April 2026, Puoch was selected 41st overall by the New York Liberty in the 2026 WNBA draft. She was the Liberty's sole pick in the draft.

== National team career ==
Puoch made her international debut for Australia at the 2025 FIBA Under-19 Women's Basketball World Cup, where she averaged 10 points, seven rebounds, and three assists per game and won a silver medal.

== Personal life ==
Puoch is the daughter of a South Sudanese immigrant and single mother, Nyakong. She has six siblings.

Her older sister, Nyadiew, is a professional basketball player who was drafted 12th overall by the Atlanta Dream in the 2024 WNBA draft and selected by the Portland Fire in the 2026 WNBA expansion draft.
