= Kaleena Mosqueda-Lewis =

American basketball player (born 1993)

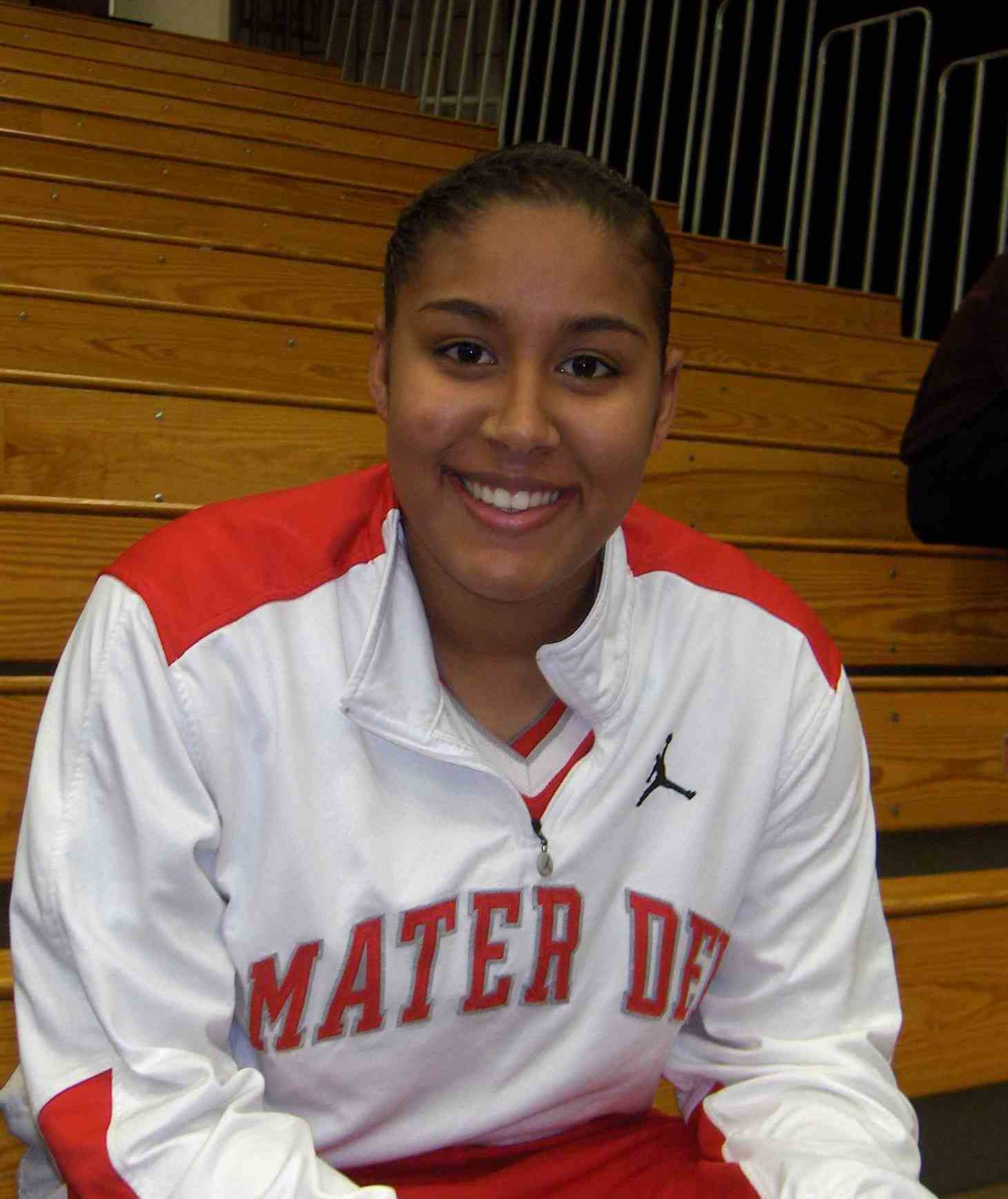

Personal information
- Born: November 3, 1993 (age 33) Pomona, California, U.S.
- Listed height: 5 ft 11 in (1.80 m)
- Listed weight: 180 lb (82 kg)

Career information
- High school: Mater Dei (Santa Ana, California)
- College: UConn (2011–2015)
- WNBA draft: 2015: 1st round, 3rd overall pick
- Drafted by: Seattle Storm
- Playing career: 2015–present
- Position: Small forward

Career history
- 2015–2019: Seattle Storm
- 2020: Connecticut Sun

Career highlights
- WNBA champion (2018); 3× NCAA champion (2013–2015); 2× Second-team All-American – AP (2013, 2015); 2× All-American – USBWA, WBCA Coaches' (2013, 2015); AAC Tournament MVP (2015); Big East Tournament MOP (2012); First-team All-AAC (2015); First-team All-Big East (2013); Big East Sixth Player of the Year (2012); Big East Freshman of the Year (2012); Big East All-Freshman Team (2012); McDonald's All-American (2011); Parade All-America first team (2009); USA Today All-USA third team (2009); Gatorade California Player of the Year (2009); ESPN National Player of the Year (2010); USA Today All-USA first team (2010); State Farm/WBCA High School Player of the Year (2011); Naismith Prep Player of the Year (2011); Gatorade National Player of the Year (2011); ESPN National Player of the Year (2011); MaxPreps National Player of the Year (2011)
- Stats at Basketball Reference
Medals
Women's basketball
Representing United States
World University Games
Gold medal – first place	2013 Kazan	Team
FIBA Under-19 World Cup
Gold medal – first place	2011 Chile	Team
FIBA U17 World Cup
Gold medal – first place	2010 France	Team
FIBA Americas U16 Championship
Gold medal – first place	2009 Mexico	Team

Kaleena Jordan Mosqueda-Lewis (born Kaleena Jordan Lewis, November 3, 1993) is an American professional basketball player for the Ballarat Miners. Prior to enrolling at the University of Connecticut she played for Mater Dei High School in Santa Ana, California. Mosqueda-Lewis was named the 2011 State Farm/WBCA High School Player of the Year by the Women's Basketball Coaches Association. In 2015 Mosqueda-Lewis was drafted third overall by the Seattle Storm, going on to win a WNBA championship with the franchise in 2018.

== Early life ==
Mosqueda-Lewis started playing basketball in the third grade. At first, she didn't like it, but she kept working at it. She played for the Tennessee Flight, a national club team, and qualified for the USA National U16 team, a team for under-16-year-olds.

== High school ==
Mosqueda-Lewis was named captain of her team, and helped lead them to the semifinals of the state tournament in 2009. She averaged over 24 points a game en route to a 31–0 regular season record. While still a sophomore, she was named the California Gatorade Player of the Year, and named a Parade All-American.

Mosqueda-Lewis led her team in scoring since her freshman year. As a junior, she was named the number one player in the country by ESPN's Hoopgurlz, while leading her team to a number one ranking in the country.

Mosqueda-Lewis and her Mater Dei high school team was invited to the 2011 Hoophall Classic, held in Springfield, Massachusetts. This was not her first experience with the event, as the team participated in 2009. She scored 17 points to help lead her team to an 85–45 victory over Murry Bergtraum from New York City. Mosqueda-Lewis committed to Connecticut in the spring of her sophomore year. She had also considered California, Kentucky, UCLA, Stanford, Tennessee, and Duke.

Mater Dei faced Brea Olinda in the finals of the 2011 Southern California regional finals. Brea Olinda, with a 29–0 record and Mater Dei, at 28–1 were not only ranked number one and two, respectively, in the county, but also in the state and in the nation. Brea Olinda scored the first four points of the game, but Mater Dei responded with 16 consecutive points. The game was closer at halftime 32–25. Mater Dei extended the margin to a 14-point lead in the third quarter, but Brea Olinda cut the lead to five with 1:24 left in the game. However, Mater Dei hit free throws, and held on to win, behind a team leading sixteen points from Mosqueda-Lewis.

Mosqueda-Lewis is known for her three-point shooting accuracy—she hit a school record nine three-point shots in a game between Mater Dei and Fairfax on March 8, 2011. She made 337 three-pointers at Mater Dei, more than anyone else in her high school's history.

Mosqueda-Lewis also holds the school record for points, with 2,744 and rebounds (876).

Mosqueda-Lewis was named the National Player of the year by both the Women's Basketball Coaches Association and the Atlanta Tipoff Club, which selects the winner of the Naismith Award for the National High School Basketball Players of the Year.

On March 17, 2011, Mosqueda-Lewis was attending school as usual, and heard an announcement that there would be an assembly to honor the girls and boys basketball team. While she awaited the start of the assembly, WNBA star Lisa Leslie greeted her and presented her with the news she was the recipient of the 2010–11 Gatorade National Girls Basketball Player of the Year. Leslie, who was the last basketball player from California to win the award, presented the award to her in a televised ceremony.

ESPN's Hoopgurlz named Mosqueda-Lewis their national player of the year, the first time the honor was awarded to the same player in consecutive seasons. The announcement of the award compared her to Maya Moore, noting that both players won a championship at the Nike Tournament of Champions, both won a Nike National title, both were ranked the number one prospect in their class, but Mosqueda-Lewis led her team to consecutive number one ranking among high school teams, a feat not accomplished by Moore.

Mosqueda-Lewis is also an active volunteer. She served on her high school student council and has volunteered with programs such as the Blind Children's Learning Center, Orange County Head Start, Urban Compass Christmas Outreach and coached at an after school program, the Upward Christian Basketball Program.

== USA Basketball ==
=== 2009 U16 Mexico City ===
Mosqueda-Lewis was selected to be a member of the first ever U16 team for USA Basketball. The team competed in the first FIBA Americas U16 Championship For Women held in Mexico City, Mexico in August 2009. She was the team's leading scorer, averaging 14 points per game, and the second leading rebounder, averaging 4.6 rebounds per game. She helped the team to a 5–0 record and the gold medal at the competition. The win secured an automatic bid to the 2010 FIBA U17 World Championship.

=== 2010 U17 France ===
Mosqueda-Lewis continued with the team as it became the U17 team. The team competed in the 2010 FIBA U17 World Championship for Women, held in Rodez & Toulouse, France during July 2010. Mosqueda-Lewis helped the team win the gold medal and an 8–0 record. She was the third leading scorer, averaging 11.6 points per game. She hit 19 three-point shots in 39 attempts. Her 19 three-point goals were almost half the team total of 40. Her tournament three-point shooting average was 48.7 percent, and included a 5–6 outing against Canada.

=== 2011 U19 World Championships – Chile ===
Mosqueda-Lewis was selected to the USA Basketball U19 squad for the U19 World Championships in Chile. The USA won their first five games, but then came up short, losing to Canada 64–52. In the medal round, they played France in the quarterfinal. The USA was down by as much as 13 points early, but took a lead with just over a minute to go in the game and ended up with the win 70–64. The USA took an early lead in the semi-final against Brazil, and went on to win to qualify for the gold medal game. She averaged 7.9 points and 4.9 rebounds per game to help lead the USA team to a gold medal. Mosqueda-Lewis played in all nine games, making two starts. In the gold medal game against Spain, she was the leading scorer with 15 points (tied with Elizabeth Williams and Stefanie Dolson).

=== 2013 World University Games – Russia ===
Mosqueda-Lewis, along with teammate Bria Hartley were two of the 12 players selected to be on the team representing the US at the World University Games held in Kazan, Russia, in July 2013. The team, coached by Sherri Coale, won the opening four games easily, scoring in triple digits in each game, and winning each by 30 or more points. After beating Sweden in the quarterfinal, they faced Australia in the semifinal. The USA team opened up as much as a 17 point in the fourth quarter of the game but the Australian team fought back and took a one-point lead in the final minute, but the US secured a 79–78 victory. The gold medal opponent was Russia, but the USA team never trailed, and won 90–71 to win the gold medal. Mosqueda-Lewis was the second leading scorer for the team, averaging 13.0 points per game. She was the leading rebounder for the team, averaging 6.8 per game.

== College career ==
Mosqueda-Lewis committed to Connecticut relatively early in the recruiting process. Although she was ranked as the top player in the country, Auriemma tried a low key recruiting approach. According to Mosqueda-Lewis, the message was, ""If you want to go there, fine. If you don't, don't". He told her "You're a California girl. You're not going to make it. I think you might be a little soft" knowing she would remember that one of the best players in the game Diana Taurasi also hailed from California. She took a trip, with her father, to visit the UConn campus when she was fifteen. She met the coaches and players, and decided this was where she wanted to attend. She was ready to make the decision on the spot, but her father insisted on including her mother in the decision. They got on the phone, and minutes later, she decided she would attend UConn. Mosqueda-Lewis had enough self-confidence to ask for player number 23, worn most recently by Maya Moore, a star and UConn and an eventual #1 pick in the 2011 WNBA draft.

=== Freshman year ===
As a freshman in 2011–12, Mosqueda-Lewis started in one of 38 games. She led the Huskies in scoring with 15 points per game and was third on the team in rebounding with 5.4 per game. Mosqueda-Lewis notched 32 double-digit performances, including 14 consecutive double-digit games to end the season. She was named Big East Freshman of the Year, Sixth Man of the Year and the second Husky freshman honored as the Big East Tournament Most Outstanding Player (2012).

=== Sophomore year ===
(National Champions) As a sophomore, Mosqueda-Lewis played and started in 38 of UConn's 39 games and led the team in scoring at 17.6 points per game. She posted the second-highest rebounding average at 6.3 rebounds per contest and shot 52.8 percent from the floor. Mosqueda-Lewis led the country in 3-point field goal shooting at 49.2 percent (118–240), was second on the team in offensive rebounds and defensive rebounds and led the squad with a 89.5 free throw shooting percentage. She scored in double-figures 31 times and led the team by scoring 20 or more points on 11 occasions. Mosqueda-Lewis scored a career-high 32 points, and tied a career-high by burying 12 3-pointers in a 85–51 victory over USF on March 2. A reliable performer during the postseason, Mosqueda-Lewis was second on the team at 16.7 points per game while shooting .483 percent from the field and .440 percent from long-range. She was third on the team during the postseason at 6.1 rebounds per game and made 12 of her 13 attempts from the free throw line during UConn's nine postseason contests Mosqueda-Lewis earned All-NCAA Tournament Team and All-Bridgeport Regional Team honors after averaging 18.7 points on 54.2 percent shooting and 5.5 rebounds during the Huskies' six NCAA Tournament victories. She led the team in scoring a team-best 19 times and had the second-most games in which she led the team in steals (8) Mosqueda-Lewis led the team in plus/minus with an average performance of +26.5.

=== Junior year ===
(Repeat National Champions) Mosqueda-Lewis struggled in her junior year. She played in 28 games and started in 26 contests was forced to sit out a total of 12 games due to injury. She scored in double-figures in 19 games, including UConn's last 10 of the season. Mosqueda-Lewis posted three double-doubles and one triple-double, a 20-point, 10-rebound, 10-assist effort in the Huskies' NCAA Second Round victory against Saint Joseph's (March 25). That performance marked the third triple-double in school history and the first during NCAA Tournament play. She was selected to the American Athletic Conference All-Tournament Team after averaging 14.7 points and shooting 47.4 percent from 3-point range. Mosqueda-Lewis continued her strong finish to the season by averaging 17.0 points, 8.3 rebounds and 3.9 assists per game during UConn's six-game run through the NCAA Tournament. She was selected as the NCAA Lincoln Regional MOP after averaging 17.3 points, 9.5 rebounds and 4.8 assists per game while shooting 51.0 percent in the Huskies first four NCAA Tournament victories.

=== Senior year ===
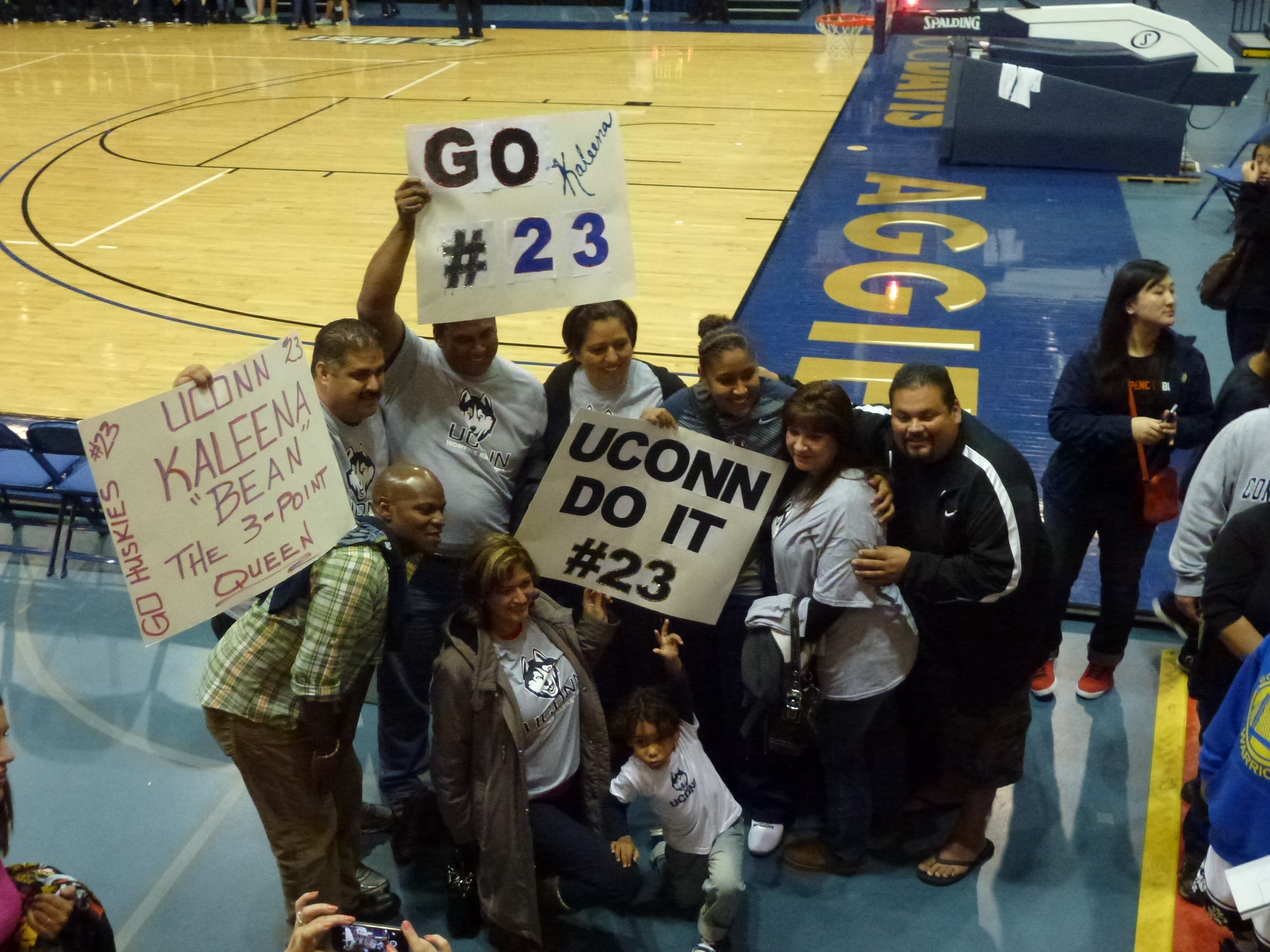
Kaleena Mosqueda-Lewis surrounded by friends and family after the UC Davis game where she tied the UConn record with ten three pointers made in a single game. She shares the record with Katie Lou Samuelson and Maya Moore.

(3-peat National Champions) Mosqueda-Lewis started her senior year by tying the record for three-pointers made in a game with ten three-pointers in thirteen attempts. She tied the record set by Maya Moore in only 24 minutes of play, in a game against UC Davis.

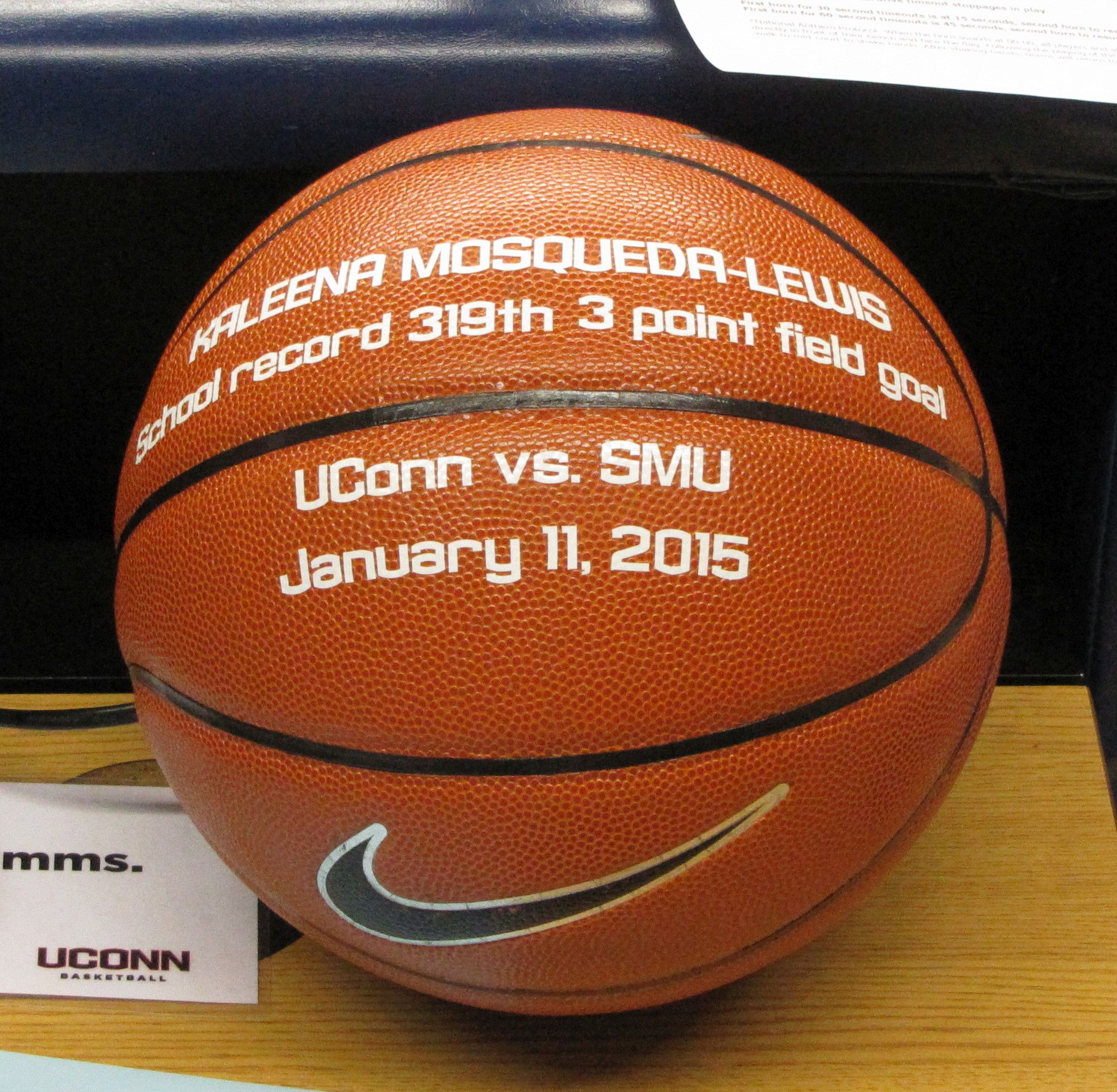
Kaleena Mosqueda-Lewis' record-setting game ball, SMU 11 Jan 2015

In a game against SMU on 11 January 2015, she hit her 319th career three-pointer, which surpassed the school record for career three-pointers held by Diana Taurasi. Later that year she broke the NCAA Division I record for career 3-pointers during UConn's 91–70 regional final win against Dayton. She ended the season with 398 threes, surpassing the prior record of 392, held jointly by Laurie Koehn and Heather Butler.

== Career statistics ==
Legend
GP	Games played	GS	Games started	MPG	Minutes per game	RPG	Rebounds per game
APG	Assists per game	SPG	Steals per game	BPG	Blocks per game	PPG	Points per game
TO	Turnovers per game	FG%	Field-goal percentage	3P%	3-point field-goal percentage	FT%	Free-throw percentage
**Bold**	Career best	°	League leader

†	Denotes season(s) in which Mosqueda-Lewis won a WNBA championship
*	Denotes season(s) in which Mosqueda-Lewis won an NCAA Championship

=== WNBA ===
==== Regular season ====
WNBA regular season statistics
Year	Team	GP	GS	MPG	FG%	3P%	FT%	RPG	APG	SPG	BPG	TO	PPG
2015	Seattle	27	0	12.3	39.0	28.1	87.5	0.9	0.6	0.2	0.1	0.8	**5.8**
2016	Seattle	32	0	12.3	39.1	35.4	77.8	0.8	**0.8**	0.2	0.1	0.8	5.2
2017	Seattle	18	1	11.1	**45.6**	29.4	**100.0**	1.2	0.5	0.2	0.1	0.8	4.6
2018^{†}	Seattle	**33**	**4**	13.4	41.2	**42.0**	91.7	**1.5**	**0.8**	0.1	0.0	0.7	5.1
2019	Seattle	31	**4**	**14.0**	39.9	34.1	**100.0**	1.2	0.5	**0.3**	**0.2**	1.2	5.5
2020	Connecticut	16	0	10.3	29.7	25.5	57.1	1.3	0.3	0.2	0.1	**0.4**	3.4
**Career**	6 years, 2 teams	157	9	12.5	39.4	33.7	87.2	1.1	0.6	0.2	0.1	0.8	5.1

==== Playoffs ====
WNBA playoff statistics
Year	Team	GP	GS	MPG	FG%	3P%	FT%	RPG	APG	SPG	BPG	TO	PPG
2016	Seattle	1	0	**15.0**	33.3	**25.0**	**100.0**	0.0	0.0	0.0	0.0	1.0	**8.0**
2017	Seattle	1	0	10.0	25.0	0.0	—	**3.0**	**1.0**	0.0	0.0	1.0	2.0
2018^{†}	Seattle	**6**	0	4.3	14.3	0.0	**100.0**	0.7	0.0	0.2	0.0	0.2	0.7
2019	Seattle	2	0	11.5	42.9	20.0	**100.0**	0.5	**1.0**	**0.5**	**1.0**	0.5	4.0
2020	Connecticut	2	0	2.5	**50.0**	0.0	—	0.0	0.5	0.0	0.0	**0.0**	1.0
**Career**	5 years, 2 teams	12	0	6.6	30.8	12.5	100.0	0.7	0.3	0.2	0.2	0.3	2.0

=== College ===
**Statistics at University of Connecticut**
Year	G	FG	FGA	PCT	3FG	3FGA	PCT	FT	FTA	PCT	REB	AVG	A	TO	B	S	MIN	PTS	AVG
2011–12	38	203	470	0.432	93	242	0.384	70	84	0.833	206	5.4	64	56	20	47	1073	569	15.0
2012–13*	38	242	458	0.528	118	240	0.492	68	76	0.895	240	6.32	89	58	12	57	1147	670	17.6
2013–14*	28	139	299	0.465	66	160	0.413	30	33	0.909	152	5.42	72	38	5	20	817	374	13.4
2014–15*	38	205	396	0.518	121	248	0.488	34	38	0.895	158	4.16	104	56	14	42	1092	565	14.9
**Career**	142	789	1623	0.486	398	890	0.447	202	231	0.874	756	5.32	329	208	51	166	4138	2178	15.3

== Awards and honors ==
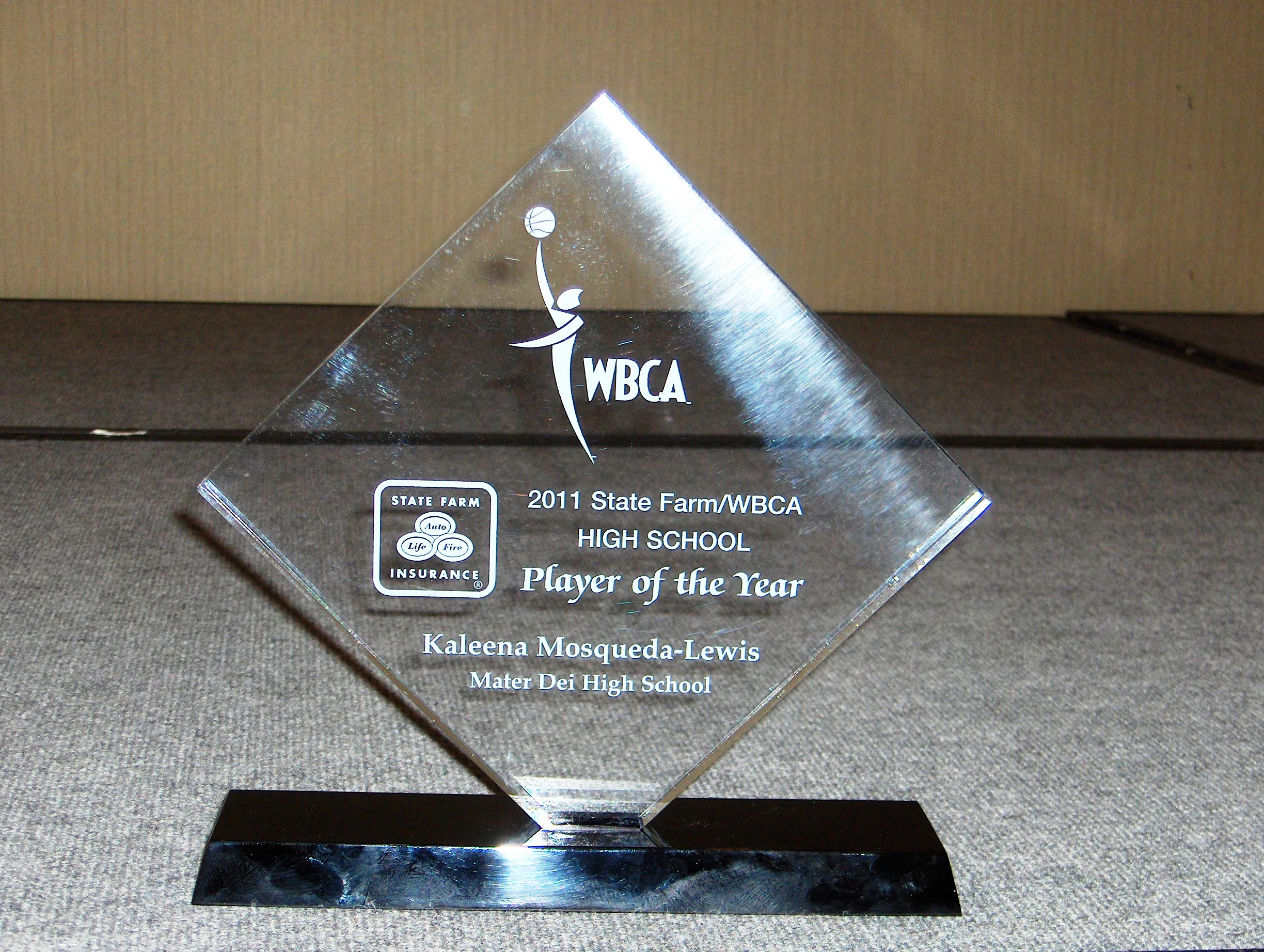
State Farm WBCA High School Player of the year Award

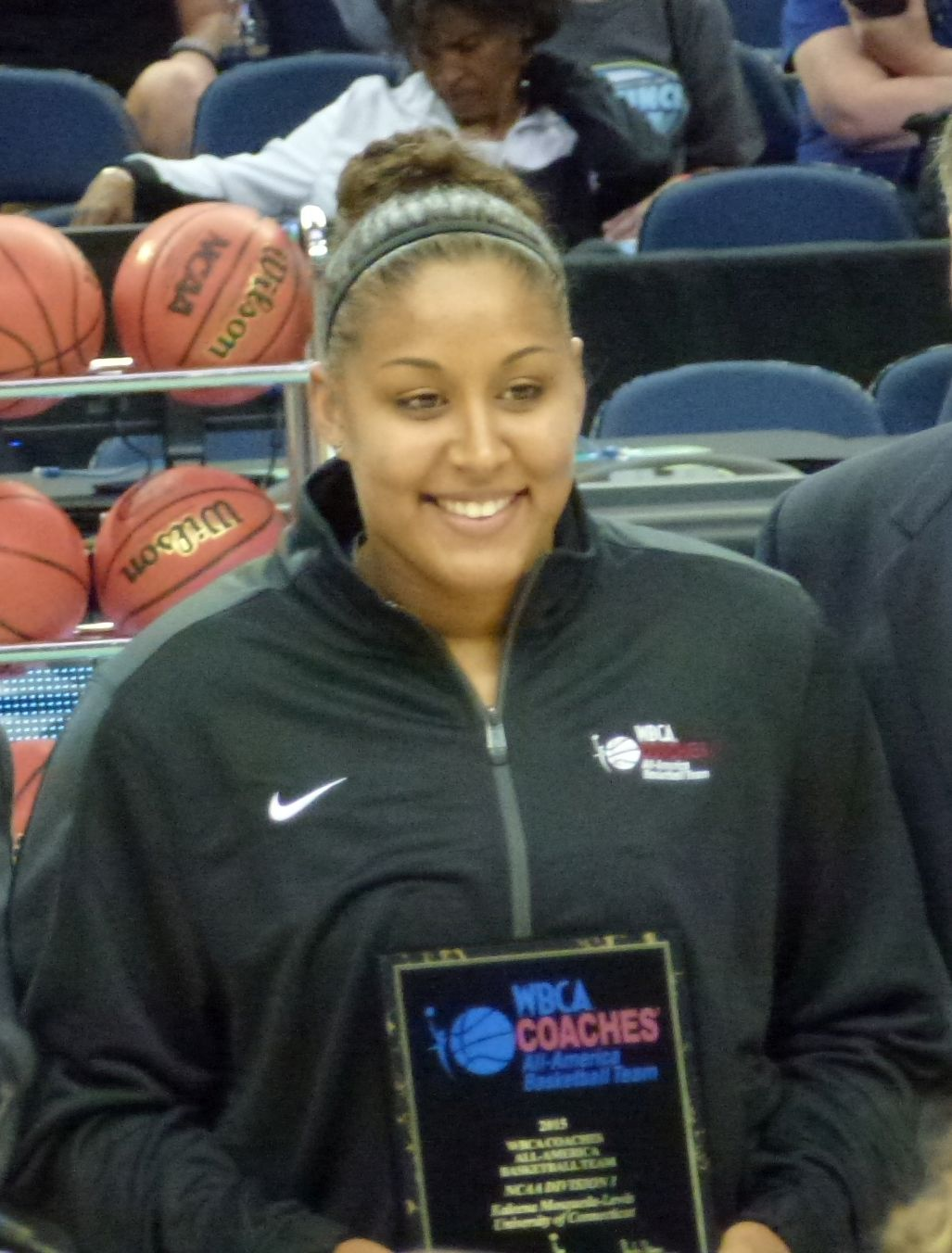
Kaleena Mosqueda-Lewis being named a member of the 2015 All-America team at the 2015 WBCA convention in Tampa Bay, Florida

- 2014—AP All-American Honorable Mention
- 2014—Lincoln Regional Most Outstanding Player
- 2013—All-NCAA Tournament Team
- 2013—NCAA Tournament All-Bridgeport Regional Team
- 2013—NCAA Final Four All-Tournament team.
- 2012—Big East Sixth Man of the Year
- 2012—Big East Freshman of the Year
- 2012—Big East Tournament Most Outstanding Player
- 2011—State Farm/WBCA High School Player of the Year
- 2011—Naismith High School Player of the Year
- 2011—Gatorade National Girls Basketball Player of the Year
- 2011—ESPN Hoopgurlz National Player of the Year
- 2011—Parade All America High School Girls Basketball Team
- 2010—ESPN Hoopgurlz National Player of the Year
- 2010—OC Register Girls Player of the Year
- 2010—Parade All America High School Girls Basketball Team
- 2010—USA Today All-USA first team
- 2009—Gatorade California girls basketball player of the year
- 2009—Parade All America High School Girls Basketball Team
- 2009—USA Today All-USA third team

== See also ==
- List of NCAA Division I women's basketball career 3-point scoring leaders
