= Aaliyah Nye =

American basketball player (born 2002)

No. 13 – Los Angeles Sparks
- Position: Shooting guard / small forward
- League: WNBA

Personal information
- Born: August 14, 2002 (age 24) Traverse City, Michigan, U.S.
- Listed height: 6 ft 0 in (1.83 m)

Career information
- High school: East Lansing (East Lansing, Michigan)
- College: Illinois (2020–2022); Alabama (2022–2025)
- WNBA draft: 2025: 2nd round, 13th overall pick
- Drafted by: Las Vegas Aces
- Playing career: 2025–present

Career history
- 2025: Las Vegas Aces
- 2026: Atlanta Dream
- 2026–present: Los Angeles Sparks

Career highlights
- WNBA champion (2025); Second team All-SEC (2024)
- Stats at Basketball Reference

Aaliyah Nye (born August 14, 2002) is an American professional basketball player for the Los Angeles Sparks of the Women's National Basketball Association (WNBA) and Athletes Unlimited Pro Basketball. She played college basketball for the Illinois Fighting Illini and Alabama Crimson Tide.

== High school career ==
Nye attended East Lansing High School in East Lansing, Michigan. During her junior year she averaged 17.8 points, 4.9 rebounds and 2.8 steals per game. During her senior year she averaged 16.1 points and 5.2 rebounds per game in a season that was shortened due to the COVID-19 pandemic. She finished her career with 1,370 points. She was named the runner-up for the 2020 Michigan Miss Basketball, and the Associated Press Division 1 Player of the Year.

She had 16 scholarship offers, and committed to play college basketball at Illinois.

== College career ==
=== Illinois ===
During the 2020–21 season, in her freshman year, she appeared in 18 games, including starts in the final 10 games of the season. She averaged 8.1 points and 2.2 rebounds in 23.0 minutes per games. She missed five games with a broken toe.

During the 2021–22 season, in her sophomore year, she appeared in 27 games, with 25 starts, and averaged 12.4 points, 3.0 rebounds, and 1.2 assists per game. She finished the season with 69 three-pointers, the ninth-most in a single season in program history. On January 9, 2022, in a game against Wisconsin, she scored a game-high 21 points, all coming on seven made three-pointers which tied the Illinois record for most three-pointers in a Big Ten Conference game. On February 14, 2022, in a game against Ohio State, she scored a then career-high 25 points.

=== Alabama ===
On April 2, 2022, Nye transferred to Alabama. During the 2022–23 season, in her junior year, she appeared in 30 games, with 26 starts, and averaged 9.3 points, 1.9 rebounds, and 0.7 assists per game. She finished the season ranked second in the SEC for three-point statistics, shooting 45.1 percent on 164 attempts. During the 2023–24 season, in her senior year, she started all 34 games and averaged 14.1 points, 3.1 rebounds, and 1.3 assists per game. She led the SEC, and ranked third nationally, in three-point field goals made. On February 25, 2024, in a game against Mississippi State, she scored a then career-high 28 points. She set a single-season program record of 108 three-pointers. Her 108 three-pointers were tied for second-most in a single season in Southeastern Conference history.

During the 2024–25 season, as a graduate student, she started all 33 games and averaged 15.2 points, 2.3 rebounds and 1.4 assists per game. On January 12, 2025, in a game against Ole Miss, she scored a career-high 32 points. On February 9, 2025, in a game against Florida, she scored a game-high 27 points and set the Alabama single-game record with nine three-pointers made. She set a single-season program record of 111 three-pointers, surpassing her record from the previous year. Following the season she was named a WBCA Coaches All-America honorable mention.

She finished her career with 1,739 points, and is Alabama's career leader in three pointers made (293).

== Professional career ==
On April 14, 2025, Nye was drafted in the second round, 13th overall, by the Las Vegas Aces in the 2025 WNBA draft. She was sitting in the audience, as she was there to support her teammate Sarah Ashlee Barker, who was also drafted a few minutes earlier by the Los Angeles Sparks.

Nye made her professional debut on May 2, 2025 in a preseason game against the Dallas Wings. In 23 minutes, she scored 17 points on 6-11 shooting including 5-8 on three-point attempts. Despite struggling during her second preseason game, Nye made the Aces roster to start the 2025 season.

On April 3, 2026, Nye was drafted eighth overall by the Toronto Tempo in the 2026 WNBA expansion draft. Nye was waived during final roster cuts.

The Atlanta Dream announced that they had claimed Nye off of waivers on May 9th, 2026.

On August 27, 2026, Nye was waived by the Dream. Two days later on August, Nye was claimed off waivers by the Los Angeles Sparks.

=== Athletes Unlimited ===
In August 2025, Nye joined Athletes Unlimited Pro Basketball for its fifth season, marking her debut with the league following her rookie year in the WNBA. Her participation added a first-year professional guard from the 2025 WNBA draft class to the Athletes Unlimited player pool.

== Personal life ==
Nye was born to James Nye and LaQueena Douglas, and has an older sister, Aazhenii, and a twin sister Aashawnti.

She is a tribal citizen of the Match-e-be-nash-she-wish Band of Pottawatomi Indians of Michigan.

== Career statistics ==
Legend
GP	Games played	GS	Games started	MPG	Minutes per game	RPG	Rebounds per game
APG	Assists per game	SPG	Steals per game	BPG	Blocks per game	PPG	Points per game
TO	Turnovers per game	FG%	Field-goal percentage	3P%	3-point field-goal percentage	FT%	Free-throw percentage
**Bold**	Career best	°	League leader

=== WNBA ===
==== Regular season ====
WNBA regular season statistics
Year	Team	GP	GS	MPG	FG%	3P%	FT%	RPG	APG	SPG	BPG	TO	PPG
2025^{†}	Las Vegas	**44**	**2**	**15.3**	.345	.314	.824	1.5	.5	**.3**	**.2**	.6	3.8
2026	Atlanta	19	0	2.3	.333	.333	**1.000**	.2	.2	.1	.1	**.1**	.7
2026	Los Angeles	1	0	14.0	**.400**	**.500**	—	**3.0**	**1.0**	.0	.0	1.0	**6.0**
**Career**	2 years, 3 teams	64	2	11.4	.346	.321	.850	1.1	.4	.2	.2	.5	3.0

==== Playoffs ====
WNBA playoff statistics
Year	Team	GP	GS	MPG	FG%	3P%	FT%	RPG	APG	SPG	BPG	TO	PPG
2025^{†}	Las Vegas	6	0	2.5	.000	.000	—	.2	—	—	—	—	.3
**Career**	1 year, 1 team	6	0	2.5	.000	.000	—	.2	—	—	—	—	.3

=== College ===
Year	Team	GP	GS	MPG	FG%	3P%	FT%	RPG	APG	SPG	BPG	TO	PPG
2020–21	Illinois	18	10	23.1	.394	.351	.588	2.2	1.0	.4	.3	**.7**	8.1
2021–22	Illinois	27	25	29.6	.417	.369	.658	3.0	1.2	1.0	**.4**	1.9	12.4
2022–23	Alabama	30	26	23.4	.454	.451	.643	1.9	.7	1.3	.2	1.0	9.3
2023–24	Alabama	**34**	**34**	31.4	.415	.417	.708	**3.1**	1.3	**1.8**	**.4**	1.4	14.1
2024–25	Alabama	33	33	**33.4**	**.454**	**.455**	**.830**	2.3	**1.4**	1.1	.3	1.3	**15.2**
**Career**		142	128	28.8	.430	.418	.718	2.5	1.1	1.2	.3	1.3	12.2
Statistics retrieved from Sports-Reference.
