= Nyadiew Puoch =

Australian basketball player

- Puoch with the Portland Fire in 2026

No. 13 – Portland Fire
- Position: Forward
- League: WNBA

Personal information
- Born: 23 June 2004 (age 22) Tasmania, Australia
- Listed height: 6 ft 3 in (1.91 m)
- Listed weight: 167 lb (76 kg)

Career information
- WNBA draft: 2024: 1st round, 12th overall pick
- Drafted by: Atlanta Dream
- Playing career: 2021–present

Career history
- 2021–2022: BA Centre of Excellence
- 2022–2024: Southside Flyers
- 2023–2025: Dandenong Rangers
- 2024–present: UC Capitals
- 2026–present: Portland Fire

Career highlights
- WNBL champion (2024); NBL1 South All Second Team (2025); NBL1 South Youth Player of the Year (2023); Nike Hoop Summit (2023)
- Stats at Basketball Reference
Medals
Women's basketball
Representing Australia
FIBA Under-19 World Cup
Silver medal – second place	2021 Hungary	Team
Under-18 Asian Championship
Gold medal – first place	2022 India	Team

Nyadiew Puoch (born 23 June 2004) is an Australian professional basketball player for the Portland Fire of the Women's National Basketball Association (WNBA) and for the UC Capitals of the Women's National Basketball League (WNBL). She previously played for the Southside Flyers of the WNBL, where she won a WNBL championship in 2024, and for the Dandenong Rangers of the NBL1 South. She helped the Australian Gems win silver at the 2021 FIBA Under-19 World Cup and gold at the 2022 FIBA Under-18 Asian Championship. She was drafted 12th overall by the Atlanta Dream in the 2024 WNBA draft.

== Early life ==
Puoch was born in Tasmania and raised in Melbourne, in the suburb of Cranbourne East. At the junior level, Puoch represented the Dandenong Rangers from under 12 through the under 18 level. She represented Victorian Metro in the Australian Junior Championships, winning gold in 2019 and 2021 and silver in 2022 where she was awarded the MVP of the Championships.

== Playing career ==
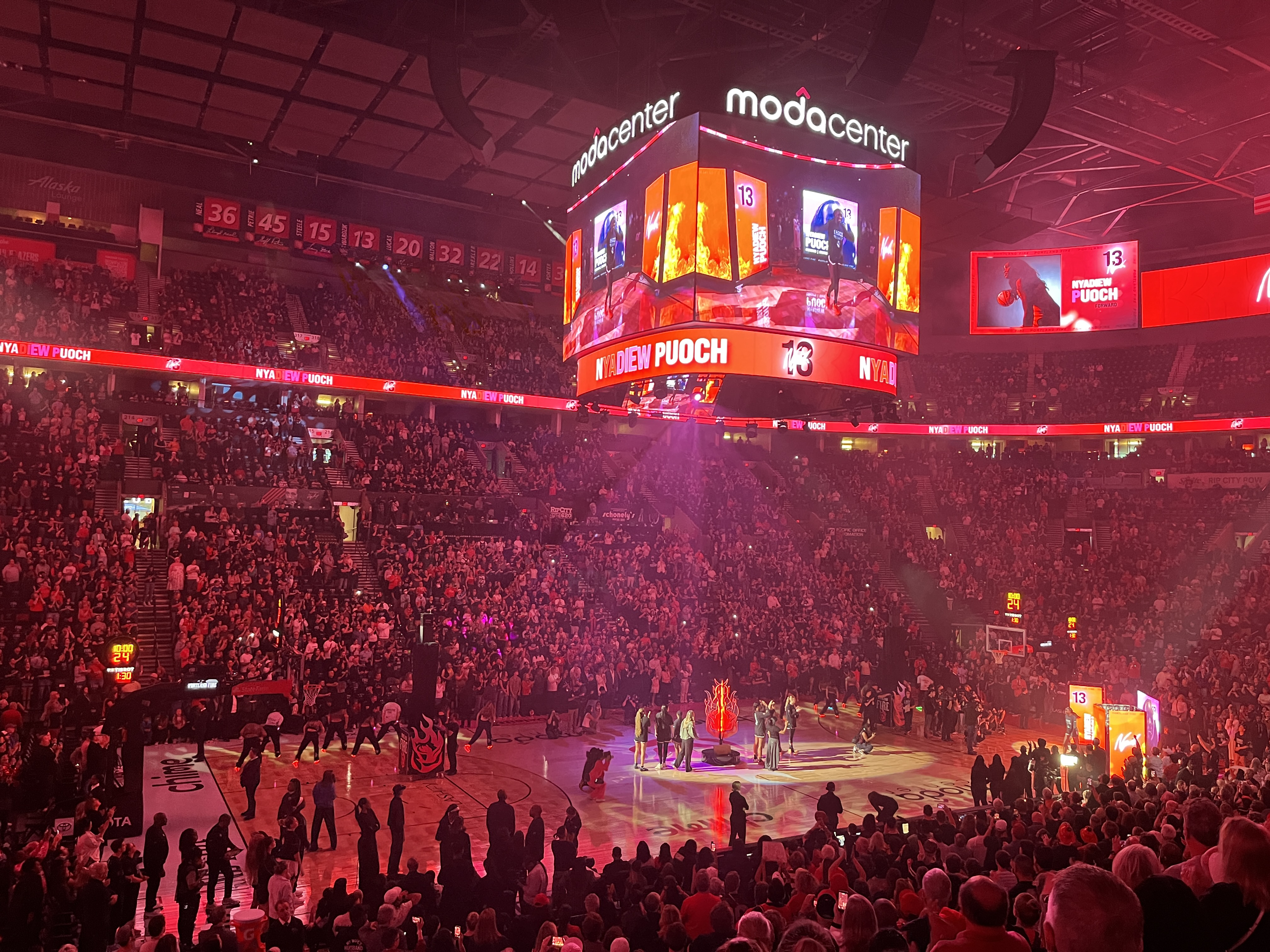
Puoch being announced at the start of the home opener, Moda Center, Portland, Oregon, May 2026

In 2021, Puoch moved to Canberra and played for the BA Centre of Excellence in the Waratah League. She averaged 8.6 points in five games. She continued with the Centre of Excellence the following year, where she averaged 11.7 points and 5.4 rebounds in 14 games during the 2022 NBL1 season.

On 8 September 2022, Puoch signed with the Southside Flyers of the WNBL for the 2022–23 season. During her first year with the Flyers she was nominated for the WNBL's Sixth Woman of the Year and Breakout Player of the Year awards. In 25 games, she averaged 5.8 points and 1.4 rebounds per game.

Puoch joined the Dandenong Rangers of the NBL1 South for the 2023 season, where she averaged 24.4 points, 7.8 rebounds, 2.5 assists, 1.5 steals and 1.1 blocks in 17 games. She was named the NBL1 South Youth Player of the Year. During the year, she competed in the inaugural women's Nike Hoop Summit game for the world select team. She recorded 16 points and a game-high four blocked shots.

On 27 July 2023, Puoch re-signed with the Flyers for the 2023–24 season. During the season she averaged 6.1 points, 3.6 rebounds, and 1.0 assists per game in 27 games and helped the Flyers win the WNBL championship.

On 15 April 2024, Puoch was drafted 12th overall by the Atlanta Dream in the 2024 WNBA draft. Puoch remained in Australia and played for the Rangers during the 2024 NBL1 season. On 9 July 2024, she signed with the UC Capitals of the WNBL for the 2024–25 season.

With the Dandenong Rangers in the 2025 NBL1 season, Puoch was named NBL1 South All Second Team. While playing with the Canberra Capitals, she faced her sister, Manuela, during the 2025–26 WNBL season season opener against the Southside Melbourne Flyers on 18 October 2025.

On 3 April 2026, she was drafted 16th overall by the Portland Fire in the 2026 WNBA expansion draft.

== National team career ==
Puoch made her international debut for Australia at the 2021 FIBA Under-19 Women's Basketball World Cup where she averaged 11.3 points, 5.4 rebounds and 1.6 assists per game and won a silver medal. She then competed at the 2022 FIBA Under-18 Women's Asian Championship where she averaged 13 points, 5.8 rebounds and 2.8 assists per game and won a gold medal.

She again represented Australia at the 2023 FIBA Under-19 Women's Basketball World Cup where she averaged 14.7 points, 5.4 rebounds and 1.6 assists in seven games.

== Personal life ==
Puoch is the daughter of a South Sudanese immigrant and single mother, Nyakong. She has six siblings. Her younger sister, Manuela, is a professional basketball player who has played for the Southside Melbourne Flyers and Dandenong Rangers and was selected 41st overall by the New York Liberty in the 2026 WNBA draft.
