= Simon Kun Puoch =

South Sudanese Lieutenant General and politician

Simon Kun Puoch is a South Sudanese military figure and politician. He had served as governor of Upper Nile (state) from 25 May 2010, until his removal by the President in August 2015. As a Lieutenant General, he also worked with the Southern Sudan Relief and Recovery Commission.
