= 2026 WNBA expansion draft =

7th WNBA expansion draft

General information
- Sport: Basketball
- Date: April 3, 2026
- Network: ESPN

Overview
- League: WNBA
- Expansion teams: Portland Fire; Toronto Tempo

The 2026 WNBA expansion draft was the seventh expansion draft of the Women's National Basketball Association (WNBA). The draft was held on April 3, 2026, for the Portland Fire and Toronto Tempo to select players from the other teams in the league to fill out their inaugural rosters for the 2026 WNBA season. Toronto was awarded an expansion team on May 23, 2024, becoming the first team in the league outside the United States, while Portland, Oregon, was awarded a team on September 18 that same year. This was the second expansion draft that featured the Fire. A previous iteration of the team took part in the 2000 expansion draft and played in the WNBA from 2000 to 2002.

On March 27, Toronto won a coin toss for the first expansion pick, but opted instead for the sixth overall selection in the 2026 WNBA draft. Consequently, Portland received the first overall expansion pick and the seventh regular draft pick. Ahead of the draft, the existing WNBA teams submitted lists of players under contract from the end of the 2025 season and were allowed to protect up to five players each. On April 1, Portland and Toronto agreed not to select any of the Chicago Sky's unprotected players. In exchange, both expansion teams received the Sky's second-round regular draft picks, while Chicago acquired Portland's second-round pick.

The Fire are owned by RAJ Sports, led by Lisa Bhathal Merage and Alex Bhathal. They paid a then-record expansion fee of US$125 million. In October 2025, the team hired Cleveland Cavaliers assistant coach Alex Sarama as the franchise's first head coach. The Fire's selections included the first overall pick in the draft, Bridget Carleton, who was acquired from the Minnesota Lynx. Other notable selections included Carla Leite from the Golden State Valkyries and Luisa Geiselsöder from the Dallas Wings. On May 6, Portland traded two of their selected players in separate deals; they traded Maya Caldwell (9th pick) to the Minnesota Lynx and Chloe Bibby (11th pick) to the Phoenix Mercury. On May 21, the Fire waived Haley Jones and Sug Sutton, who were the 14th and 20th picks, respectively.

The Tempo are owned by Kilmer Sports Ventures, led by Larry Tanenbaum, who paid US$115 million for the team. In November 2025, the team hired veteran coach Sandy Brondello as the franchise's inaugural head coach. The Tempo's selections included Julie Allemand from the Los Angeles Sparks with the second overall pick. Other notable additions included Nyara Sabally from the New York Liberty and Marina Mabrey from the Connecticut Sun. On April 30, Toronto waived 23rd pick Kristy Wallace. A week later, the team waived three more of their selections: Aaliyah Nye (8th pick), Nikolina Milić (19th pick), and Kitija Laksa (21st pick). On July 31, the team traded the rights of Maria Kliundikova (15th pick) and a 2028 second round draft pick to the Connecticut Sun in exchange for Aneesah Morrow.

== Rules ==
The expansion draft consisted of two rounds in snake draft format: the team that picks first in the first round picks last in the second round, and vice versa.

- The Fire and the Tempo were permitted to select one unprotected player from each of the other 13 existing teams' 2025 rosters.
- For players who were selected by an expansion team but were not under contract for the 2026 season, the drafting team acquired the same rights to that player that their former team would have held.
- Players who had completed their prior contracts and possessed at least five years of service in the league were designated as "potential unrestricted free agents". Each expansion team was permitted to select only one potential unrestricted free agent in this draft.
- The following deals were permitted to be made by the expansion teams:
  - Agreeing to select a player from an unprotected list and trade that player to a team other than her existing team
  - Agreeing to select or not select a player from a team's unprotected list; Portland and Toronto exercised this with their non-selection from Chicago's list

== Selections ==
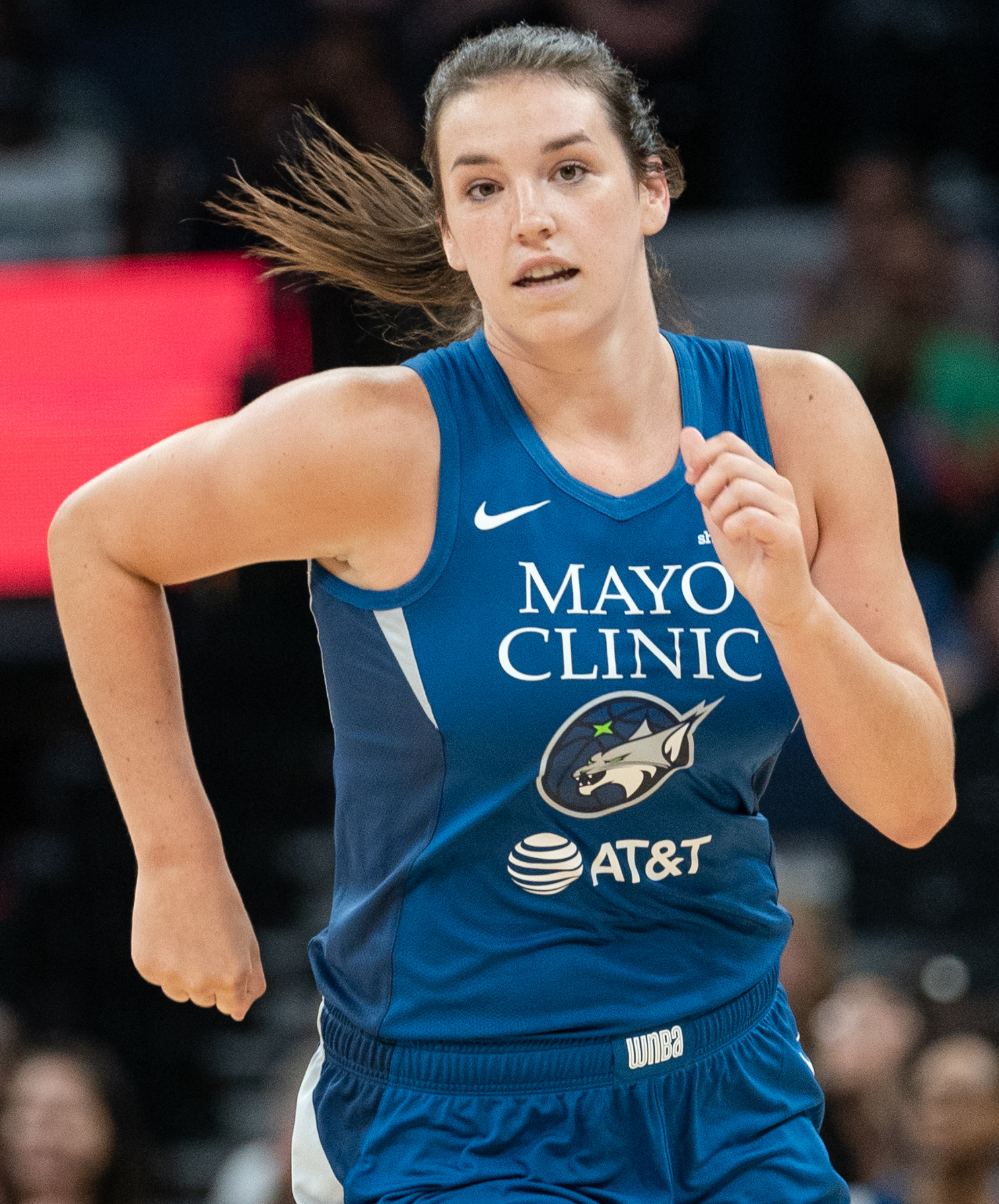
Bridget Carleton

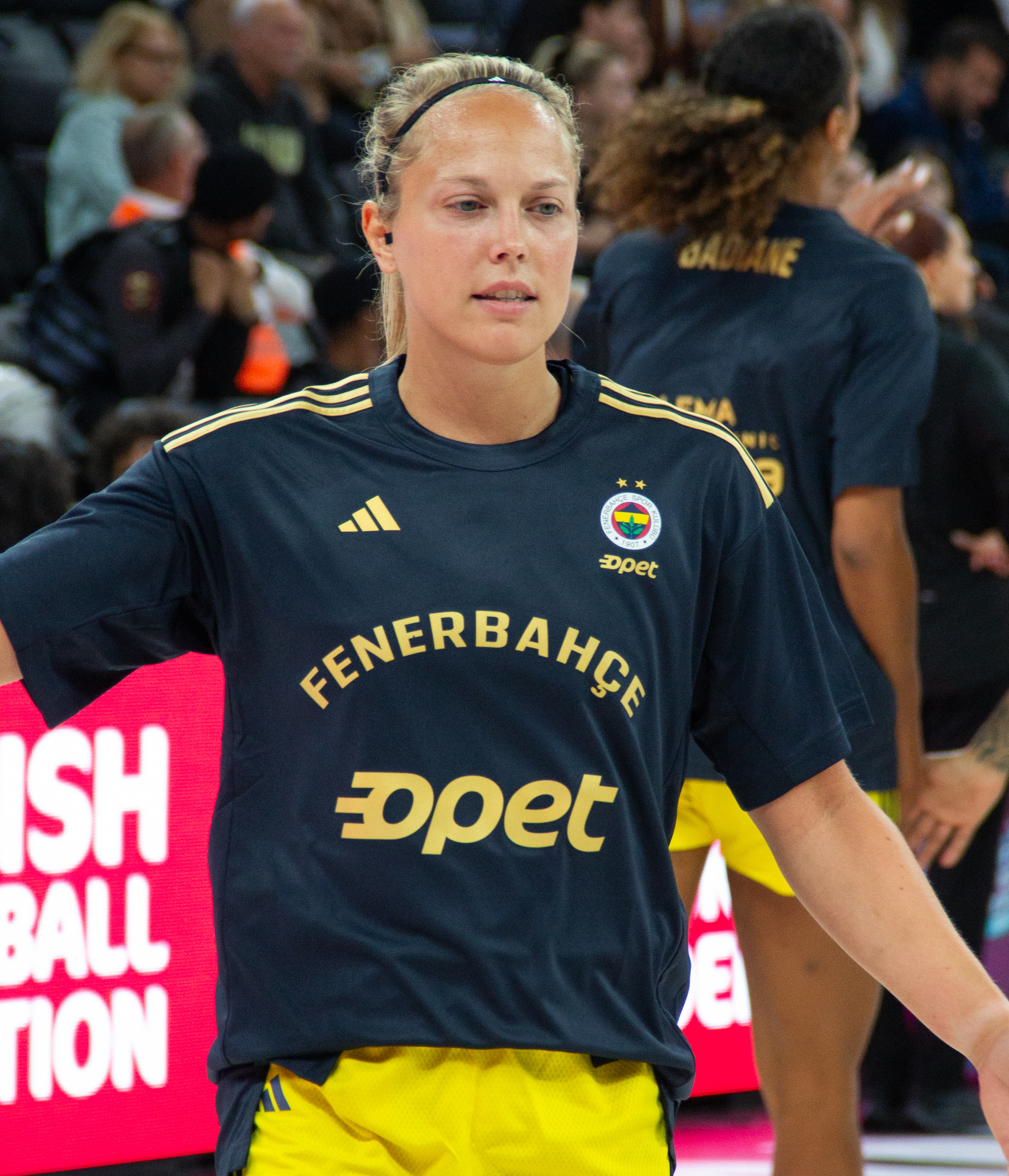
Julie Allemand

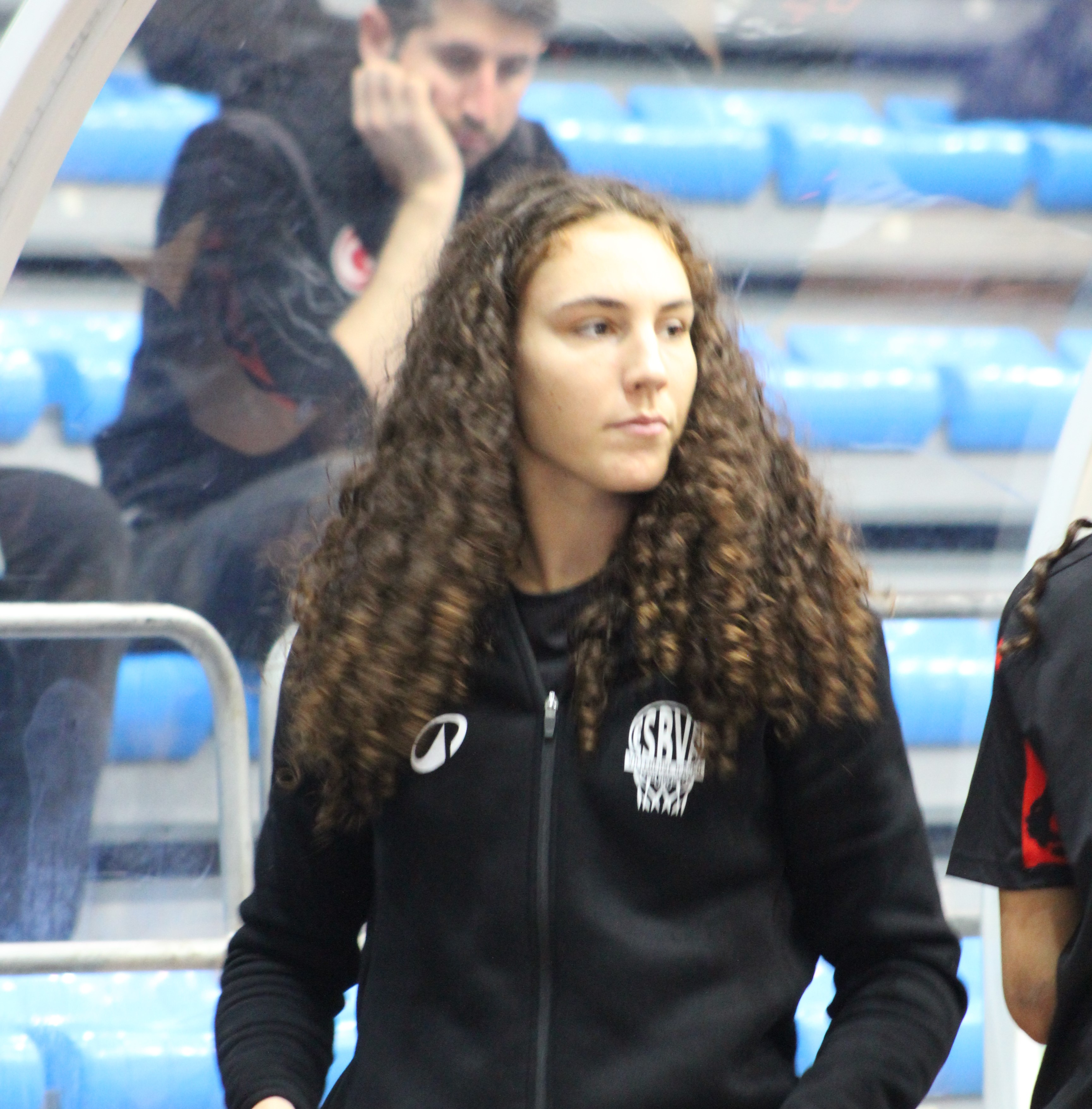
Carla Leite

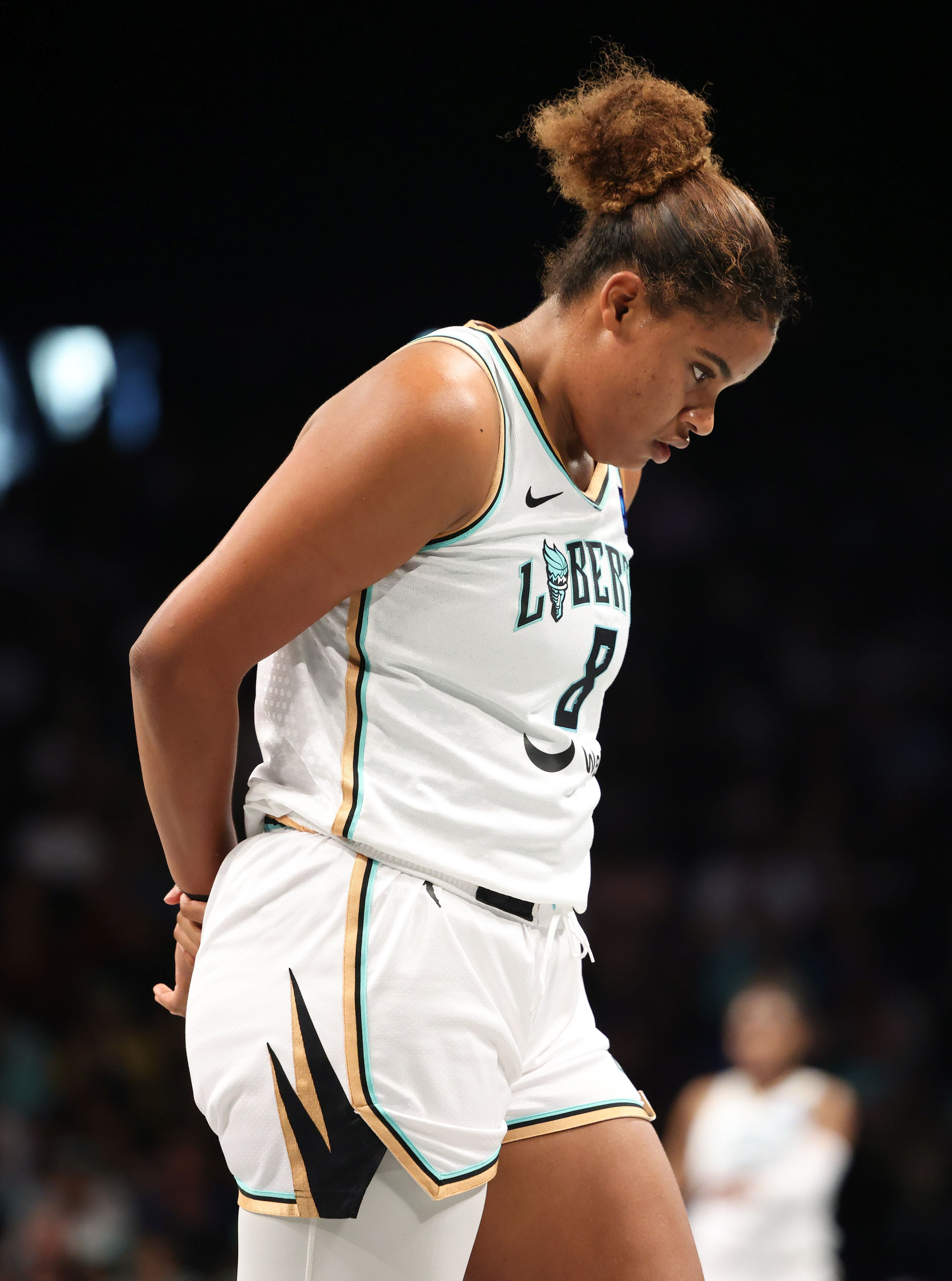
Nyara Sabally

Carleton and Leite were selected first and third respectively by the Portland Fire, and Allemand and Sabally were selected second and fourth by the Toronto Tempo.

Key
Abbreviation	Position
G	Guard
F	Forward
C	Center

^{+}	Denotes player who has been selected for at least one All-Star Game
^{#}	Denotes player who never played in the WNBA regular season or playoffs

Draft selections
Rnd.	Pick	Player	Pos.	Nationality	Team	Previous team	WNBA years (Note: Number of years played in the WNBA prior to the draft)	Career with franchise (Note: Career with the expansion franchise that drafted the player)	Ref.
1	1	Bridget Carleton	F	Canada	Portland Fire	Minnesota Lynx	7	2026–present	
1	2	Julie Allemand	G	Belgium	Toronto Tempo	Los Angeles Sparks	3	2026–present	
1	3	Carla Leite	G	France	Portland Fire	Golden State Valkyries	1	2026–present	
1	4	Nyara Sabally	C	Germany	Toronto Tempo	New York Liberty	3	2026–present	
1	5	Luisa Geiselsöder	C	Germany	Portland Fire	Dallas Wings	1	2026–present	
1	6	Marina Mabrey^{+}	G	United States	Toronto Tempo	Connecticut Sun	7	2026–present	
1	7	Emily Engstler	F	United States	Portland Fire	Washington Mystics	4	2026–present	
1	8	Aaliyah Nye	G	United States	Toronto Tempo	Las Vegas Aces	1	— (Note: Waived prior to the 2026 WNBA season)	
1	9	Maya Caldwell	G	United States	Portland Fire	Atlanta Dream	4	— (Note: Traded prior to the 2026 WNBA season)	
1	10	Lexi Held	G	United States	Toronto Tempo	Phoenix Mercury	1	2026–present	
1	11	Chloe Bibby	G	Australia	Portland Fire	Indiana Fever	1	—	
1	12	No selection / pass	—	—	Toronto Tempo	—	—	—	
2	13	María Conde	F	Spain	Toronto Tempo	Golden State Valkyries	0	2026–present	
2	14	Haley Jones	G	United States	Portland Fire	Dallas Wings	3	2026	
2	15	Maria Kliundikova	F	Russia	Toronto Tempo	Minnesota Lynx	3	— (Note: Traded on July 31, 2026 to the Connecticut Sun)	
2	16	Nyadiew Puoch	G	Australia	Portland Fire	Atlanta Dream	0	2026–present	
2	17	Adja Kane^{#}	F	France	Toronto Tempo	New York Liberty	0	—	
2	18	Sarah Ashlee Barker	G	United States	Portland Fire	Los Angeles Sparks	1	2026–present	
2	19	Nikolina Milić	F	Serbia	Toronto Tempo	Connecticut Sun	2	—	
2	20	Sug Sutton	G	United States	Portland Fire	Washington Mystics	4	2026	
2	21	Kitija Laksa	F	Latvia	Toronto Tempo	Phoenix Mercury	1	—	
2	22	No selection / pass	—	—	Portland Fire	—	—	—	
2	23	Kristy Wallace	G	Australia	Toronto Tempo	Indiana Fever	3	—	
2	24	Nika Mühl	G	Croatia	Portland Fire	Seattle Storm	1	—	
