= Three-point field goal =

Basketball field goal made from beyond the designated three-point line (arc)

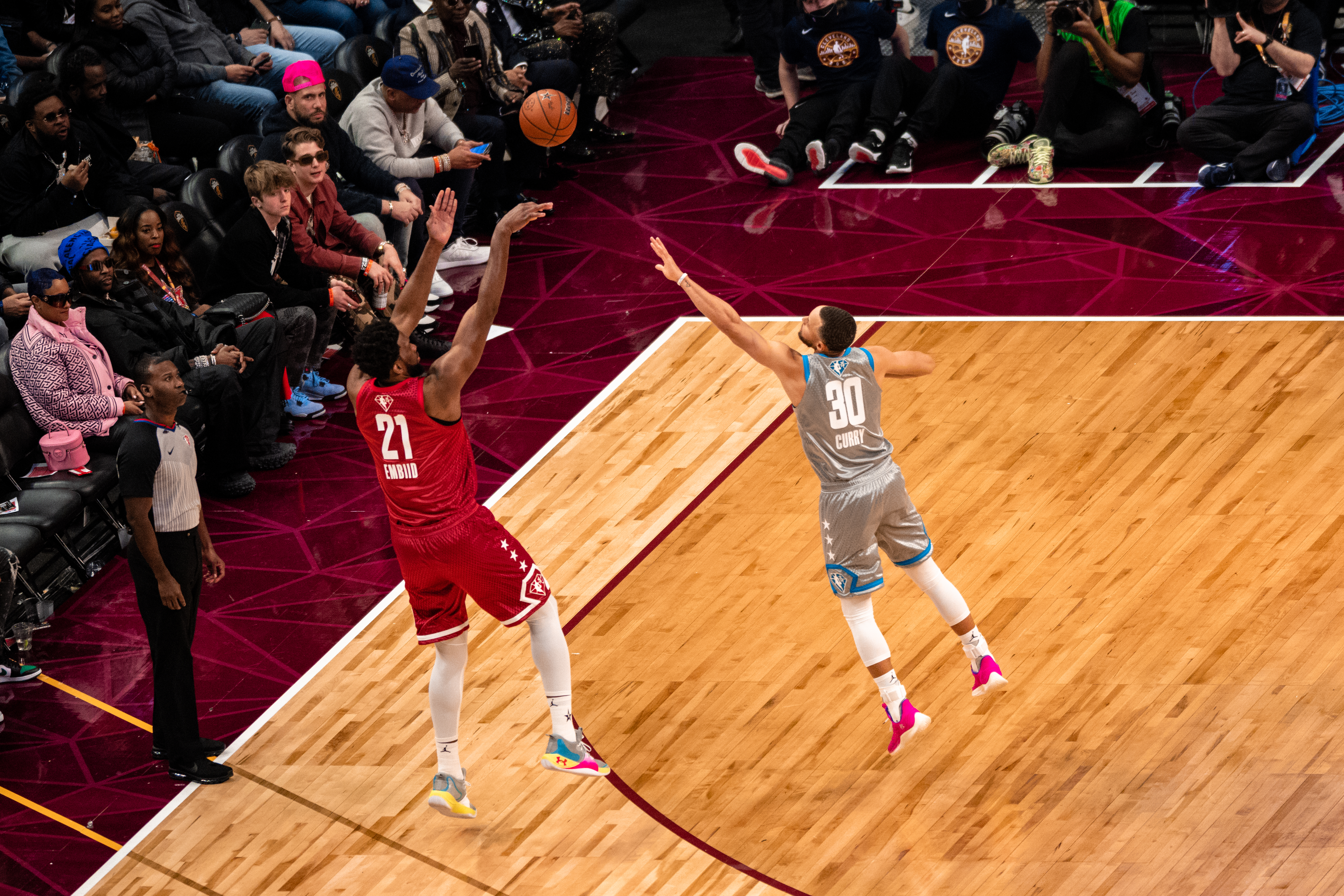
Joel Embiid shoots a three-point shot over Stephen Curry during the 2022 NBA All-Star Game.

A three-point field goal (also 3-pointer, three, trey, or triple) is a field goal in a basketball game made from beyond the three-point line, a designated arc surrounding the basket. A successful basket is worth three points, in contrast to the two points awarded for field goals made within the three-point line and the one point for each made free throw.

The distance from the basket to the three-point line varies by competition level: in the National Basketball Association (NBA) the arc is 23 feet 9 inches (7.24 m) from the center of the basket; in the International Basketball Federation (FIBA), the Women's National Basketball Association (WNBA), the National Collegiate Athletic Association (NCAA) (all divisions), and the National Association of Intercollegiate Athletics (NAIA), the arc is 6.75 m (22 ft 1.75 in) from the center of the basket; and in the National Federation of State High School Associations (NFHS) the arc is 19 ft 9 in (6.02 m) from the center of the basket. Every three-point line becomes parallel to each sideline at the points where each arc is a specified distance from the sideline. In both the NBA and WNBA, this distance is 3 feet (0.91 m) from the sideline; as a result, the distance from the center of the basket gradually decreases to a minimum of 22-foot (6.71 m). FIBA specifies the arc's minimum distance from the sideline as 0.9 meters (2 ft 11 in), resulting in a minimum distance from the center of the basket of 6.6 meters (21 ft 8 in). The NCAA and NAIA arc is the same distance from the center of the basket as the FIBA arc, but is 3 feet 4 inches (1.02 m) from each sideline because the North American court is slightly wider than the FIBA court. In 3x3, a FIBA-sanctioned variant of the half-court 3-on-3 game, the same line exists, but shots from behind it are only worth 2 points with all other shots worth 1 point.

== History ==
The three-point line was tested at the collegiate level in 1945, with a 21-foot (6.4 m) line, in a game between Columbia and Fordham, but it was not kept as a rule. There was another one-game experiment in 1958, this time with a 23-foot (7.01 m) line, in a game between St. Francis (NY) (Note: Later known athletically as St. Francis Brooklyn, before the school shut down its athletic program in 2023.) and Siena. In 1961, Boston University and Dartmouth played one game with an experimental rule that counted all field goals as three points. In 1962, the St. Francis (New York) head coach, Daniel Lynch, once again made the suggestion of a three-point line to the New York Basketball Writers Association.

At the direction of commissioner Abe Saperstein, the newly formed American Basketball League (ABL) became the first basketball league to institute the rule in 1961. Saperstein wanted to add excitement to the game and distinguish the league from the bigger NBA. He hoped the three-pointer would become basketball's equivalent of the home run. "We must have a weapon," Saperstein said, "and this is ours."

To determine the distance the new shot line should be from the basket, Saperstein and longtime DePaul University coach Ray Meyer went onto a court one day with tape and selected 25 feet (7.62 m) as the right length. "They just arbitrarily drew lines," his son Jerry Saperstein said. "There's really no scientific basis. Just two Hall of Fame coaches getting together and saying: 'Where would we like to see the line?'" Not long after, in June 1961, Saperstein was traveling when the other seven ABL owners voted 4–3 to officially shorten the line, to 22 feet (6.71 m). Saperstein, who had significant power in the league as owner of the popular Harlem Globetrotters basketball entertainers, disagreed with this and simply ignored the ruling. Games continued with the 25 feet shot. Saperstein eventually acknowledged there was one problem with the 25-foot arc and solved it by adding a 22-foot line in the corners. "It made for interesting possibilities," he wrote.

After the ABL shut down in 1963, the three-point shot was adopted by the Eastern Professional Basketball League in its 1963–64 season. It was also popularized by the American Basketball Association (ABA), which introduced it in its inaugural 1967–68 season. ABA commissioner George Mikan stated that the three-pointer "would give the smaller player a chance to score and open up the defense to make the game more enjoyable for the fans". During the 1970s, the ABA used the three-point shot, along with the slam dunk, as a marketing tool to compete with the NBA. Its ninth and final season concluded in the spring of 1976.

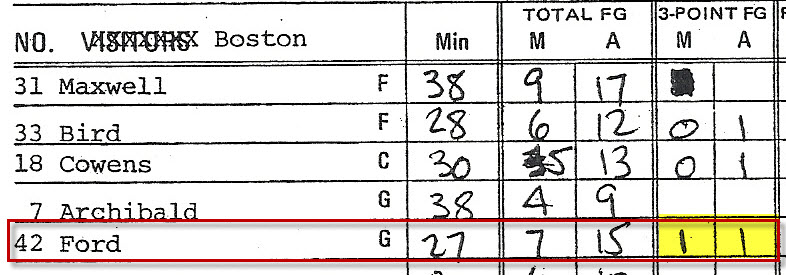
The official scorer's report showing the first three-point field goal in NBA history on October 12, 1979

Three years later, in June 1979, the NBA adopted the three-point line (initially on a one-year trial) for the 1979–80 season, despite the view of many that it was a gimmick. Chris Ford of the Boston Celtics is credited with making the first three-point shot in NBA history on October 12, 1979. The season opener at Boston Garden was more remarkable for the debut of Larry Bird (and two new head coaches). Rick Barry of the Houston Rockets, in his final season, also made one in the same game, and Kevin Grevey of the Washington Bullets made one that Friday night as well. Barry would later set the original 3-point record at 8 in a single game on February 9, 1980 against the Utah Jazz. The three-point field goal was slow to be adopted by teams in the NBA. In the 1980 NBA Finals, Julius Erving made the only three of the series (and first in Finals history) in Game 3, and in Game 4, neither team attempted a single shot beyond the arc.

In its early years, the three-point shot was considered to be nothing more than a gimmick or desperation tactic, but in the late 1980s the three-pointer began to emerge as an important offensive weapon. Danny Ainge was the first player to make over 100 three-pointers in a season in 1988, scoring 148 that season. In the following years, players like Ainge, Dale Ellis, Michael Adams, Vernon Maxwell and Reggie Miller gained a reputation as three-point specialists. In 1994, Ellis became the first NBA player to reach 1,000 career three-pointers. In 1995, John Starks became the first player to make over 200 three-pointers in a season. In 1997, Miller surpassed Ellis as the NBA's all-time leader in three-pointers, eventually retiring with a record 2,560 three-pointers made. Miller remained the all-time leader in three-pointers made until 2011.

The sport's international governing body, FIBA, introduced the three-point line in 1984, at 6.25 m (20 ft 6 in), and it made its Olympic debut in 1988 in Seoul, South Korea.

The NCAA's Southern Conference became the first collegiate conference to use the three-point rule, adopting a 22-foot (6.71 m) line for the 1980–81 season. Ronnie Carr of Western Carolina was the first to score a three-point field goal in college basketball history on November 29, 1980. Over the following five years, NCAA conferences differed in their use of the rule and distance required for a three-pointer. The line was as close as 17 ft 9 in (5.41 m) in the Atlantic Coast Conference, and as far away as 22 ft (6.71 m) in the Big Sky.

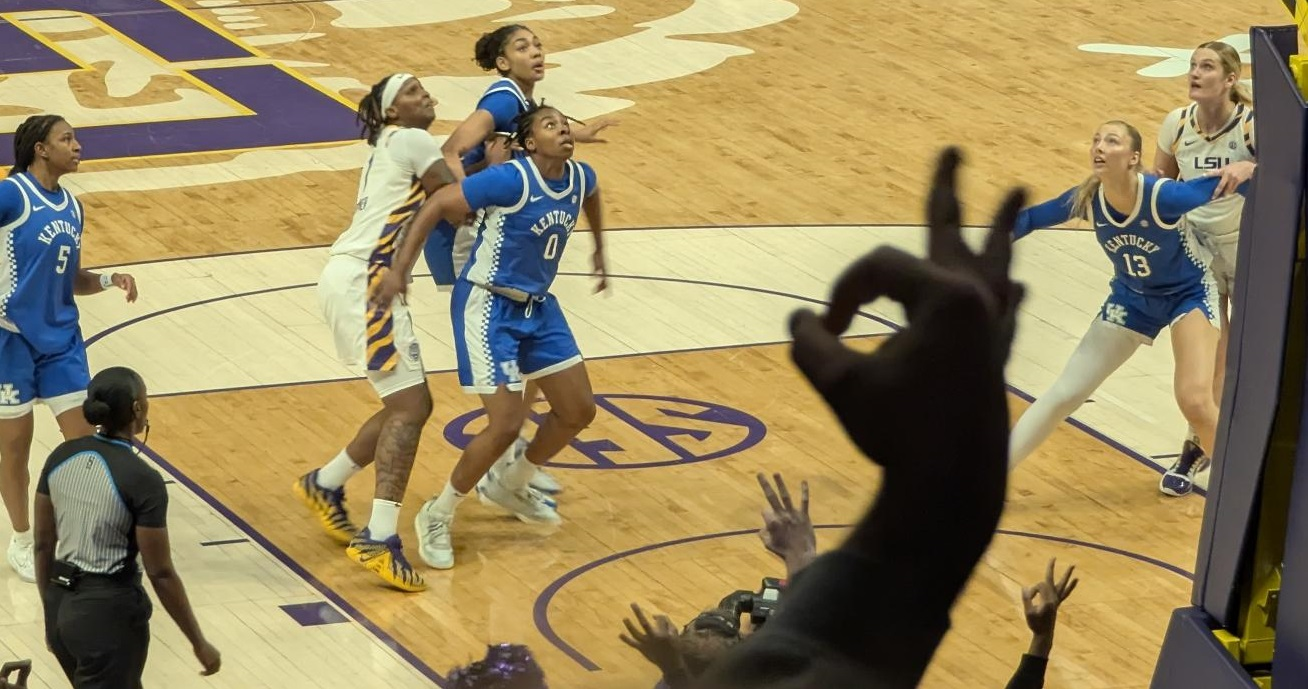
Fans hold up the 3-point hand sign at a basketball game.

Used only in conference play for several years, it was adopted by the NCAA in April 1986 for the 1986–87 season at 19 ft 9 in (6.02 m) and was first used in the NCAA tournament in March 1987. The NCAA adopted the three-pointer in women's basketball on an experimental basis for that season at the same distance, and made its use mandatory beginning in 1987–88. In 2007, the NCAA lengthened the men's distance by a foot to 20 ft 9 in (6.32 m), effective with the 2008–09 season, and the women's line was moved to match the men's in 2011–12. The NFHS, along with elementary and middle schools, adopted a 19 ft 9 in (6.02 m) line nationally in 1987, a year after the NCAA. The NCAA experimented with the 6.75 m (22 ft 1 3/4 in) FIBA three-point line distance in the National Invitation Tournament (NIT) in 2018 and 2019, then adopted that distance for all men's play with a phased conversion that began with Division I in the 2019–20 season. The NAIA and other American associations also adopted the new NCAA distance for their respective men's play. In that same 2019–20 season, the NCAA planned to experiment with the FIBA arc in women's postseason events other than the NCAA championships in each division, most notably the Women's National Invitation Tournament and Women's Basketball Invitational; these events were ultimately scrapped due to the COVID-19 pandemic. The NCAA announced on June 3, 2021 that the FIBA three-point distance would be extended to the women's game starting in 2021–22.

For three seasons beginning in 1994–95, the NBA attempted to address decreased scoring by shortening the distance of the line from 23 ft 9 in (7.24 m) (22 ft (6.71 m) at the corners) to a uniform 22 ft (6.71 m) around the basket. From the 1997–98 season on, the NBA reverted the line to its original distance of 23 ft 9 in (22 ft at the corners).

In 2008, FIBA announced that the distance would be increased by 50 cm (19.7 in) to 6.75 m (22 ft 1 3/4 in), with the change being phased in beginning in October 2010. In December 2012, the WNBA announced that it would use the FIBA distance, starting in 2013; by 2017, the distance at the corners was lengthened to match the NBA. The NBA has discussed adding a four-point line, according to president Rod Thorn.

== Three-point revolution ==
In the NBA, attempting three-point field goals has become increasingly frequent in the modern day, particularly from mid-2015 onwards. The increase in latter years has been attributed to two-time NBA MVP Stephen Curry, who is credited with revolutionizing the game by inspiring teams to more heavily employ the three-point shot as part of their winning strategy, as well as shoot from well beyond the arc.

Curry is the NBA's all-time leading scorer in three-point field goals made and is ranked highest in "Off Ball" average attention drawn. Calculated by the average attention each player receives as the total amount of time guarded by each defensive player divided by the total time playing, Curry's was ranked at 1.064, with Kevin Durant coming in second at 1.063, in a 2015 study.

Season	Average three-point goals per game	Average three-point attempts per game	Effectiveness
1979–1980	0.8	2.8	29%
1989–1990	2.2	6.6	33%
1999–2000	4.8	13.7	35%
2009–2010	6.4	18.1	36%
2019–2020	12.2	34.1	36%
2021–2022	12.4	35.2	35%
2022–2023	12.0	34.2	35%
2023–2024	12.8	35.1	36%
2024–2025	13.5	37.6	37%

== Rule specifications ==
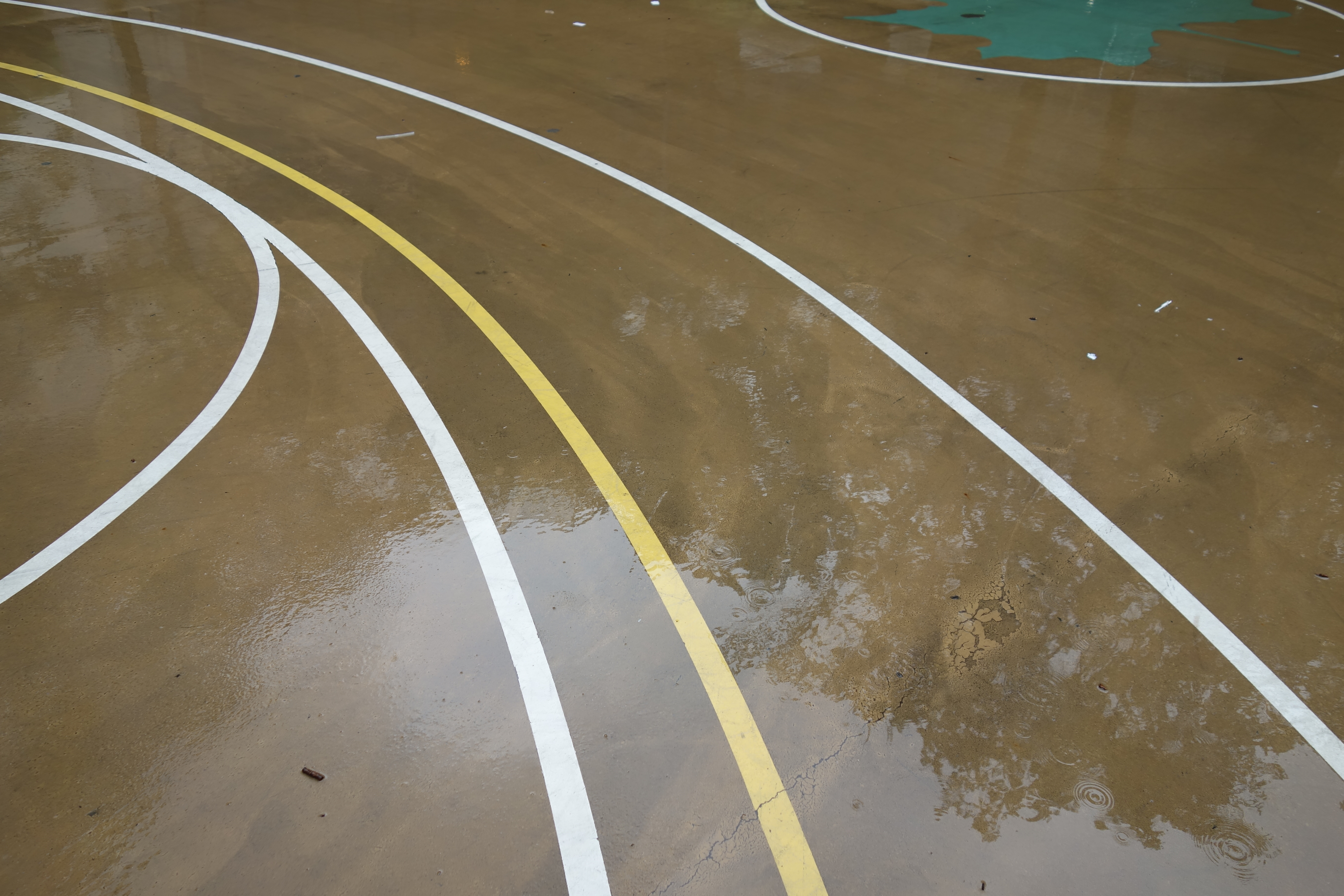
A court with multiple three-point lines in New York City. From left to right: high school distance, NCAA women's distance (before 2021–22), and NBA distance.

A three-point line consists of an arc at a set radius measured from the point on the floor directly below the center of the basket, and two parallel lines equidistant from each sideline extending from the nearest end line to the point at which they intersect the arc. In the NBA, WNBA, NCAA or NAIA, and FIBA standards, the arc spans the width of the court until it is a specified minimum distance from each sideline. The three-point line then becomes parallel to the sidelines from those points to the baseline. The unusual formation of the three-point line at these levels allows players some space from which to attempt a three-point shot at the corners of the court; the arc would be less than 2 feet (0.61 m) from each sideline at the corners if it were a continuous arc. In American high school standards, the arc spans 180° around the basket, then becomes parallel to the sidelines from the plane of the basket center to the baseline (5 feet 3 inches or 1.6 meters). During the period in which the NCAA/NAIA arc was at 20 ft 9 in (6.32 m) from the center of the basket, the arc was 4 feet 3 inches or 1.3 meters from the sideline in that area. The distance of the three-point line to the center of the hoop varies by level:

Competition	Arc radius	Minimum distance from sidelines	Reference
NBA	7.24 metres (23 ft 9 in)	3 ft 0 in (0.91 m)	
FIBA; NAIA; NCAA (Note: In the 2019–20 season, the NCAA used the FIBA arc only in Division I men's play. Divisions II and III adopted the FIBA arc for men's play in 2020–21, and all women's play adopted the FIBA arc in 2021–22.); WNBA	6.75 metres (22 ft 1 3/4 in)	FIBA: 0.9 m (2 ft 11 in); NAIA, NCAA: 3 ft 4 in (1.02 m); WNBA: 3 ft 0 in (0.91 m)	
NFHS	6.02 metres (19 ft 9 in)	5 ft 3 in (1.6 m)	

The high school corner minimum is taken as a requirement for newer high school gymnasiums and fieldhouses built in the three-point era. Courts built in older eras before state high school sanctioning bodies issued rules regarding court sizes have narrower markings, requiring home court ground rules where there is less space behind the three-point arc, the space on the sides of the arc can barely accommodate the shooter's feet due to lack of room, or it may be marked closer than the suggested minimum.

A player's feet must be completely behind the three-point line at the time of the shot or jump in order to make a three-point attempt; if the player's feet are on or in front of the line, it is a two-point attempt. A player is allowed to jump from outside the line and land inside the line to make a three-point attempt, as long as the ball is released in mid-air.

An official raises his/her arm with three fingers extended to signal the shot attempt. If the attempt is successful, he/she raises his/her other arm with all fingers fully extended in manner similar to a football official signifying successful field goal to indicate the three-point goal. The official must recognize it for it to count as three points. Instant replay has sometimes been used, depending on league rules. The NBA, WNBA FIBA and the NCAA specifically allow replay for this purpose. In NBA, WNBA & FIBA games, video replay does not have to occur immediately following a shot; play can continue and the officials can adjust the scoring later in the game, after reviewing the video. However, in late game situations, play may be paused pending a review.

If a shooter is fouled while attempting a three-pointer and subsequently misses the shot, the shooter is awarded three free-throw attempts. If a player completes a three-pointer while being fouled, the player is awarded one free-throw for a possible 4-point play. Conceivably, if a player completed a three-pointer while being fouled, and that foul was ruled as either a Flagrant 1 or a Flagrant 2 foul, the player would be awarded two free throws for a possible 5-point play.

In 3x3, where shots from behind the arc are worth 2 points, the shooter is normally awarded two free throws if the shot is missed and one if the shot is made. However, if the fouling team has committed more than 6 fouls in the game, the shooter receives two free throws regardless of the result of the basket attempt. If the foul is the team's 10th (or greater), the shooter's team also gets possession of the ball.

== Influence on Modern Basketball Strategy ==
The influence of the three-point field goal is also seen in the strategy with which basketball is currently being played. In recent times, there has been a considerable improvement in the statistical analysis of basketball. The statistical analysts have found that although there is a lesser probability of a three-point field goal entering the basket compared to a two-point field goal, there is a greater value in a three-point field goal if it is made compared to a two-point field goal. In recent times, there has been a focus on shots that are near the basket and shots from behind the three-point line.

The influence of the three-point shot is also seen in the strategies employed by teams in the National Basketball Association in recent times. In the 1990s and early 2000s, teams in the NBA were averaging a low number of three-point shots from behind the three-point line. However, in the 21st century, the three-point shot has become an important aspect of the strategies employed by teams in the NBA. The teams have employed various strategies to ensure that their players get a chance to shoot from behind the three-point line.

The emphasis that has come to be placed on long-range shooting has also impacted player development. Guards and forwards are often expected to have reliable long-range shooting abilities, while some centers have developed their skills to include long-range shooting as well. This has led to the development of "stretch" players that are able to draw defenders away from the basket and provide more room for other players.

As a result of the various developments that have come to be placed on strategy within basketball, it is agreed that the three-point field goal is one of the most important rule changes that has impacted the evolution of basketball.

== Related concepts ==
Major League Lacrosse (MLL) introduced a two-point line which forms a 15-yard (14 m) arc around the front of the goal. Shots taken from behind this line count for two points, as opposed to the standard one point. The Premier Lacrosse League, which absorbed MLL in a December 2020 merger, plays under MLL rules, including the two-point arc.

In gridiron football, a standard field goal is worth three points; various professional and semi-pro leagues have experimented with four-point field goals. NFL Europe and the Stars Football League adopted a rule similar to basketball's three-point line in which an additional point was awarded for longer field goals; in both leagues any field goal of 50 yards (46 m) or more was worth four points. The Arena Football League awarded four points for any successful drop kicked field goal (like the three-point shot, the drop kick is more challenging than a standard place kick, as the bounce of the ball makes a kick less predictable, and arena football also uses narrower goal posts for all kicks than the outdoor game does).

During the existence of the World Hockey Association (WHA) in the 1970s, there were proposals for two-point hockey goals for shots taken beyond an established distance (one proposal was a 44-foot (13.4 m) arc, which would have intersected the faceoff circles), but this proposal gained little support and faded after the WHA merged with the National Hockey League. It was widely believed that long-distance shots in hockey had little direct relation to skill (usually resulting more from goalies' vision being screened or obscured), plus with the lower scoring intrinsic to the sport a two-point goal was seen as disruptive of the structure of the game.

The super goal is a similar concept that was added in some games of Australian rules football, in which a 50-meter (55 yd) arc determines the value of a goal; within the arc, it is the usual 6 points, but 9 points are scored for a "super goal" scored from outside the arc. To date the super goal is only used in pre-season games and not in the season proper.

The former National Professional Soccer League II, which awarded two points for all goals except those on the power play, also used a three-point line, drawn 45 feet (14 m) from the goal. It has since been adopted by some other indoor soccer leagues.

The 2020 Super Netball league season saw the addition of the two-goal Super Shot. The Super Shot provides goal attacks and goal shooters the opportunity to score two goals by shooting from a 1.9 m designated zone within the goal circle and will be active in the final five minutes of each quarter.

== See also ==
- NBA records
- 50–40–90 club, exclusive group of players who have made at least 50% of field goals (counting both two-pointers and three-pointers), 40% of three-pointers, and 90% of free throws in a season.
- List of National Basketball Association career 3-point scoring leaders
- List of National Basketball Association annual 3-point scoring leaders
- List of National Basketball Association career 3-point field goal percentage leaders
- List of National Basketball Association annual 3-point field goal percentage leaders
- List of NCAA Division I men's basketball career 3-point scoring leaders
- List of NCAA Division I women's basketball career 3-point scoring leaders
- List of Women's National Basketball Association career 3-point scoring leaders
- List of NCAA Division I men's basketball players with 12 or more 3-point field goals in a game
