= Mike Gettis =

Canadian Businessman, Entrepreneur and Investor

- Born: Calgary, Alberta
- Occupations: Entrepreneur, investor
- Years active: 2015–present
- Known for: Endy Sleep, Kilne

Mike Gettis is a Canadian businessman based in Toronto, Ontario. He is the founder and former CEO of Endy Sleep, a Canadian e-commerce company. He is also the co-founder and CEO of Kilne, a Canadian cookware company. During his time at Endy, the company was named the Fastest Growing Retailer in Canada by Maclean's and Canadian Business.

== Early life ==
Gettis was born in Calgary, Alberta. He received an undergraduate degree in computer engineering from the University of Toronto. Later, he attended Vlerick Business School in Belgium where he received an MBA degree.

== Career ==
After completing his MBA in Belgium, Gettis joined a home goods producer and distributor in Europe, where he oversaw the sales power of an in-demand product and distribution channel combined. In 2011, he founded Overbrands, a collection of brands, which most notably sold 1,000,000 Somus pillows from 2011-2015. Based on the success of Overbrands, Gettis co-founded Canadian mattress brand Endy in 2015, where he served as the Founder and CEO. He oversaw Endy’s business strategy, operations, company culture, growth and brand vision. In 2019, Gettis co-founded Kilne, where he is the CEO alongside president and co-founder Noelle Hjelte. Kilne is a cookware company with no traditional retail markup.

Gettis is also an angel investor to help support entrepreneurs and their companies. Gettis has supported the Black Innovation Fellowship through Ryerson University to help Black entrepreneurs. He has also supported both the Furniture Bank and Second Harvest to help donate furniture and meals to those in need. Gettis is also an executive contributor for the Huffington Post.

=== Endy ===
Endy was founded in 2015 by Gettis and Rajen Ruparell in Toronto, Canada as an online mattress retailer. The company's revenue was estimated to be $1 million in 2015, $10 million in 2016 and $20 million in 2017. Endy was sold in 2018 for $89 Million to Sleep Country Canada in one of Canada’s largest-ever e-commerce acquisitions. The company has generated over $250 million in sales and has received several awards including Techweek 100 - Innovators Award and Fastest Growing Retailer in Canada.

=== Kilne ===
In 2019, Gettis and his partner Noelle Hjelte founded Kilne Cookware, a direct-to-consumer cookware company that sells cookware products online. The company is expected to drive sales to $1 million by 2021. Gettis is the CEO of the company and Hjelte is the president.
