= GIK =

GIK may refer to:

- Gik, Iran
- Ghulam Ishaq Khan (1915–2006), former president of Pakistan
- Ghulam Ishaq Khan Institute of Engineering Sciences and Technology, a private engineering institute in Khyber Pakhtunkhwa, Pakistan
- Gifts in kind
- Great Invention Kit
