= Carly Fiorina =

American businesswoman and politician (born 1954)

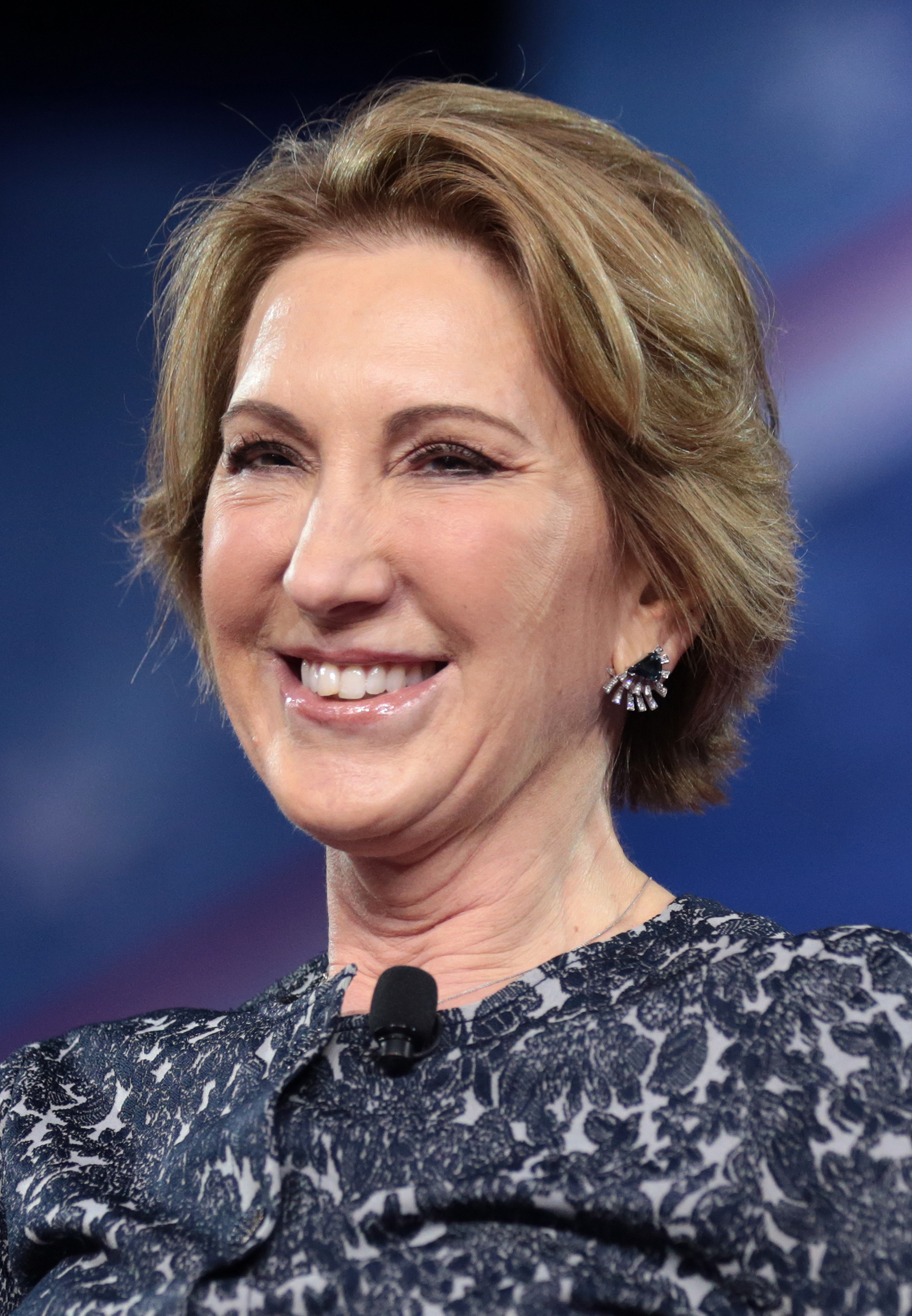
- Fiorina in 2017

Personal details
- Born: Cara Carleton Sneed; September 6, 1954 (age 72) Austin, Texas, U.S.
- Party: Republican
- Spouses: Todd Bartlem (m. 1977–1984); Frank Fiorina (m. 1985)
- Children: 2 stepdaughters
- Relatives: Joseph Sneed (father)
- Education: Stanford University (BA); University of California, Los Angeles (attended); University of Maryland (MBA); Massachusetts Institute of Technology (MS)
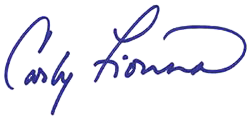
- Signature
- Website: Official website

Cara Carleton "Carly" Fiorina (/ˌfiːəˈriːnə/; née Sneed; born September 6, 1954) is an American businesswoman and politician, known primarily for her tenure as chief executive officer (CEO) of Hewlett-Packard (HP) from 1999 to 2005. Fiorina is the first woman to lead a Fortune Top-20 company. She is also known for her candidacies for U.S. Senate in California in 2010 and for president of the United States in 2016.

Fiorina is a graduate of Stanford University (BA, 1976), University of Maryland, College Park (MBA, 1980) and Massachusetts Institute of Technology (MS, 1989). She joined AT&T as a management trainee in 1980. In 1990, she was named senior vice president and oversaw the company's hardware and systems division. In 1995, Fiorina led corporate operations for Lucent Technologies, Inc., a spin-off of AT&T's Western Electric and Bell Labs divisions. She played a key role in planning and implementing the 1996 initial public offering of a successful stock and company launch strategy. Later in 1996, Fiorina was appointed president of Lucent's consumer products sector. In 1997, she was named group president for Lucent's US$19 billion global service-provider business. That year, Fiorina chaired a US$2.5 billion joint venture between Lucent's consumer communications and Royal Philips Electronics, under the name Philips Consumer Communications (PCC). In the October 12, 1998 edition of Fortune, Fiorina was described as "The Most Powerful Woman in American Business".

Fiorina was named chief executive officer of HP in July 1999. In 2002, Fiorina oversaw what was then the largest technology sector merger in history, in which HP acquired rival personal computer manufacturer, Compaq. The transaction made HP the world's largest seller of personal computers. HP subsequently laid off 30,000 U.S. employees. Nonetheless, the number of employees exceeded the pre-merger figure and grew to 150,000 during her tenure. In February 2005, she was forced to resign as CEO and chair following a boardroom disagreement. She subsequently served as chair of the philanthropic organization Good360.

Fiorina was an adviser to Republican senator John McCain's 2008 presidential campaign. In 2010, she won the Republican nomination for the United States Senate in California, but lost the general election to incumbent Democrat Barbara Boxer. Fiorina was a candidate in the 2016 Republican presidential primary; after her campaign ended, she became the vice-presidential running mate of U.S. Senator Ted Cruz until he suspended his campaign.

== Early life and education ==
Cara Carleton Sneed was born on September 6, 1954, in Austin, Texas, the daughter of Madelon Montross (née Juergens) and Joseph Tyree Sneed III. The name "Carleton", from which "Carly" is derived, has been used in every generation of the Sneed family since the Civil War. At the time of her birth, Fiorina's father was a professor at the University of Texas School of Law. He would later become the dean of Duke University School of Law, a Deputy U.S. Attorney General, and a judge on the United States Court of Appeals for the Ninth Circuit. Fiorina's mother was an abstract painter. Fiorina is mainly of English and German ancestry. She was raised Episcopalian.

Fiorina has said that she was a Brownie but did not become a Girl Scout due to her family's frequent moves. She attended Channing School in London. Fiorina also attended five different high schools, including one in Ghana. She graduated from Charles E. Jordan High School in Durham, North Carolina. At one time, she aspired to be a classical pianist.

Fiorina received a Bachelor of Arts in philosophy and medieval history from Stanford University in 1976. She worked as a secretary for Kelly Services in the summers during her college years. She attended UCLA School of Law in 1976, but dropped out after one semester. Fiorina worked as a receptionist for six months at a real estate firm, Marcus & Millichap. She later moved up to a broker position there. When she married in 1977, she and her husband moved to Bologna, Italy, where he did graduate work; in Italy, she tutored Italian businessmen in the English language.

In 1980, Fiorina received a Master of Business Administration in marketing from the Robert H. Smith School of Business at the University of Maryland, College Park. In 1989, she obtained a Master of Science degree in management from the MIT Sloan School of Management under the Sloan Fellows program.

== Business career ==
=== AT&T and Lucent ===
In 1980, Fiorina joined AT&T as a management trainee, selling telephone services to large federal agencies. In 1990, she became the company's first female officer; she was named senior vice president and oversaw the company's hardware and systems division. She later headed the company's North American operations.

In 1995, Fiorina led corporate operations for Lucent Technologies, Inc., a spin-off of AT&T's Western Electric and Bell Labs divisions. In that capacity, she reported to Lucent chief executive Henry B. Schacht. She played a key role in planning and implementing the 1996 initial public offering of a successful stock and company launch strategy. The spin-off became one of the most successful IPOs in U.S. history, raising US$3 billion.

Later in 1996, Fiorina was appointed president of Lucent's consumer products sector. In 1997, she was named group president for Lucent's US$19 billion global service-provider business, overseeing marketing and sales for the company's largest customer segment. That year, Fiorina chaired a US$2.5 billion joint venture between Lucent's consumer communications and Royal Philips Electronics, under the name Philips Consumer Communications (PCC). In the October 12, 1998 edition of Fortune, Fiorina was described as "The Most Powerful Woman in American Business".

Lucent added 22,000 jobs, revenues grew from US$19 billion to US$38 billion, and the company's market share increased in every region for every product. According to Fortune, Lucent increased sales by lending money to their own customers: "In a neat bit of accounting magic, money from the loans began to appear on Lucent's income statement as new revenue while the dicey debt got stashed on its balance sheet as an allegedly solid asset". Lucent's stock price grew 10-fold.

=== Hewlett-Packard (HP) ===
==== Hiring ====
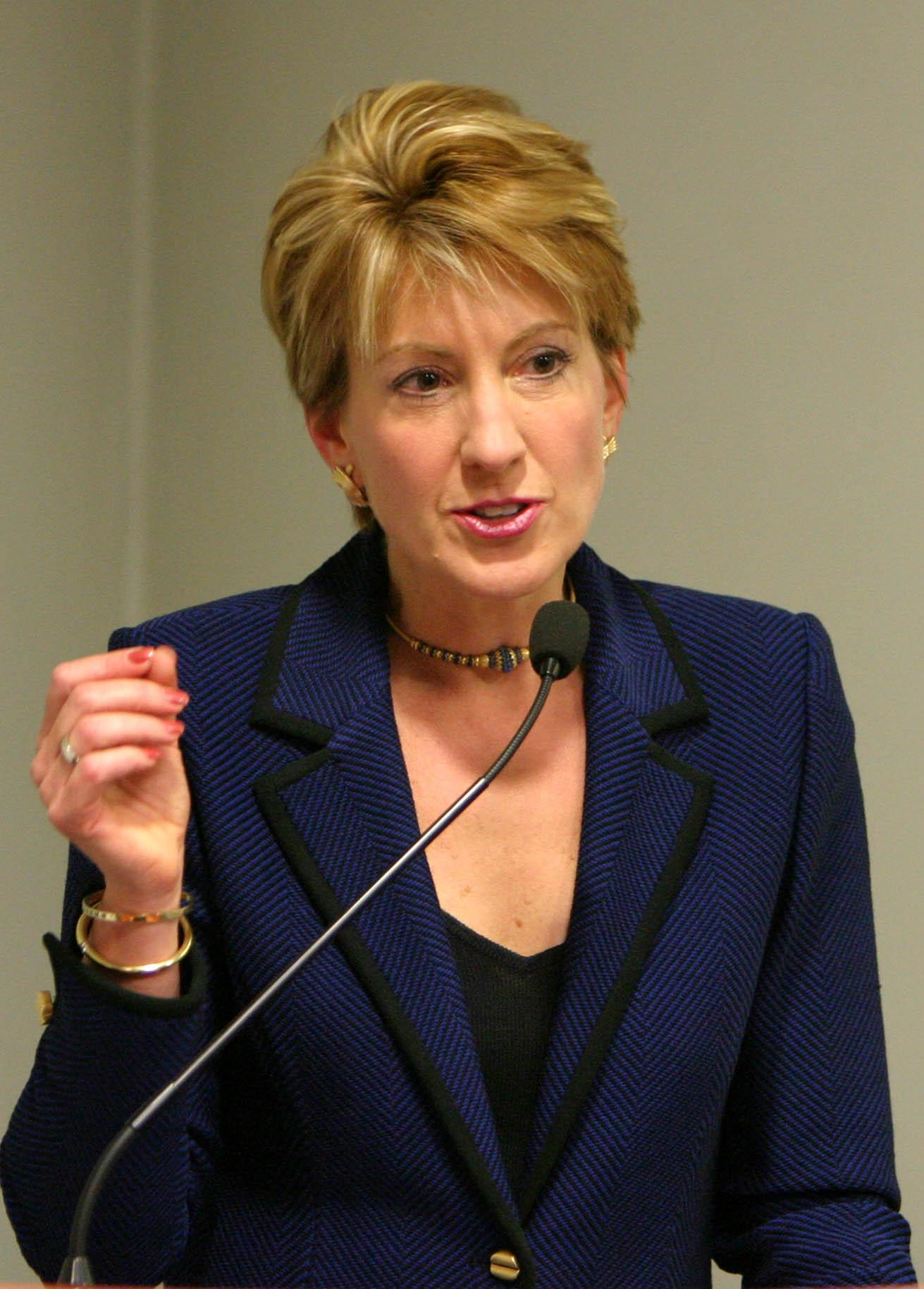
Fiorina as CEO and Chair of the Board of Hewlett-Packard, August 2, 2004

In July 1999, Hewlett-Packard Company named Fiorina chief executive officer. Fiorina succeeded Lewis Platt and was chosen over internal candidate Ann Livermore. Matthew Boyle of Fortune magazine said of Fiorina's hiring as HP's first woman CEO that, "Carly Fiorina didn't just break the glass ceiling, she obliterated it, as the first woman to lead a FORTUNE 20 company."

Writing in Fortune magazine in August 2015, Jeffrey Sonnenfeld described the hiring as the result of "a dysfunctional HP board committee, filled with its own poisoned politics, hired her with no CEO experience, nor interviews with the full board." Fiorina received a larger signing offer than any of her predecessors, including: US$65 million in restricted stock to compensate her for the Lucent stock and options she left behind, a US$3 million signing bonus, a US$1 million annual salary (plus a US$1.25–US$3.75 million annual bonus), US$36,000 in mortgage assistance, a relocation allowance, and permission (and encouragement) to use company planes for personal affairs. Fortune also named her the most powerful woman in America for five consecutive years.

==== Separating Agilent Technologies from HP and proposed PWC acquisition ====
Although the decision to spin off the company's analytical instruments division pre-dated her arrival, one of her first major responsibilities as chief executive was overseeing the separation of the unit into the stand-alone Agilent Technologies. Fiorina proposed the acquisition of the technology services arm of PricewaterhouseCoopers for almost US$14 billion, but withdrew the bid after a lackluster reception from Wall Street. Following the collapse of the dot-com bubble, the PwC consulting arm was acquired by IBM for less than US$4 billion. HP later acquired Electronic Data Systems, another technology services company, which some considered a validation of Fiorina's strategy.

==== Compaq merger ====
In early September 2001, in the wake of the bursting of the Tech Bubble, Fiorina announced the acquisition of PC maker Compaq with US$25 billion in stock, which, at the time, was the second largest producer of personal computers, after Dell. HP stock traded down by 30% on the news of the merger. The Compaq merger created the world's largest personal computer manufacturer in terms of units shipped.

Fiorina was frequently at odds with HP's board of directors, and she had to fight with the board for the merger. Walter Hewlett (the son of company co-founder William Hewlett) was a source of particularly strong opposition. Hewlett originally voted with the other board members to approve the Compaq deal, but he later changed his mind. He launched a proxy fight against Fiorina's efforts which Fiorina won with a "razor-thin margin" of 51.4% of the shareholders, with the institutional shareholders providing the bulk of the support. Fiorina was supported in the proxy battle by other board members, including Richard Hackborn, Philip M. Condit, George A. Keyworth, II, and Robert Knowling. Fiorina proceeded to reorganize HP and merge the parts of it that she kept with Compaq.

The merger was met initially with almost universal skepticism. The February 7, 2005, issue of Fortune described her merger plan as "failing" and the prognosis as "doubtful". Business professor Robert Burgelman and former HP executive vice president, Webb McKinney, who led HP's post-merger integration team, analyzed the merger and concluded that it was ultimately successful. In 2008, former acting CEO of Compaq Ben Rosen stated that although Fiorina lacked the skills to run the merged company, her successors made it work. HP was able to integrate Compaq's operations and emerge as the world's largest seller of personal computers. The industry soon fell into decline, leading to further difficulties for the company. HP eventually wrote off US$1.2 billion from the acquisition as the personal computer market declined. Looking back, a 2011 The New York Times article described it as "one of the more questionable deals of the time."

==== Allegations of sales to Iran despite sanctions ====
In 1997, prior to Fiorina's joining the company, HP's Dutch subsidiary formed a partnership with a company in Dubai, Redington Gulf, which sold HP's products in Iran. Under Fiorina's leadership at HP, the company sold millions of dollars' worth of printers and computer products to Iran through the foreign subsidiary, while U.S. export sanctions were in effect. After the story was initially reported by The Boston Globe in 2008, the SEC sent a letter of inquiry to HP, who responded that products worth US$120 million were sold in fiscal 2008 arguing that the sales did not violate export sanctions because they were made through a foreign subsidiary. According to former officials who worked on sanctions, HP was using a loophole by routing their sales through a foreign subsidiary. HP ended its relationship with Redington Gulf after the SEC inquiry.

==== Providing HP servers to the NSA ====
In a September 2015 interview with Michael Isikoff, Fiorina said that, in the weeks following the September 11 terrorist attacks in 2001, she received a phone call from Michael Hayden, then the director of the National Security Agency, asking her assistance in providing HP computer servers to the NSA for expanded surveillance. Hayden confirmed that he had made the request for HP servers as part of Stellar Wind, a 2001–2007 NSA warrantless surveillance program, but the details were not revealed to Fiorina at the time. Fiorina "acknowledged she complied with Hayden's request, redirecting trucks of HP computer servers that were on their way to retail stores from a warehouse in Tennessee to the Washington Beltway, where they were escorted by NSA security" to the agency's Fort Meade headquarters. In 2015, Fiorina said: "I felt it was my duty to help, and so we did," adding, "They were ramping up a whole set of programs and needed a lot of data crunching capability to try and monitor a whole set of threats. ... What I knew at the time was our nation had been attacked." Hayden also requested that Fiorina provide advice to the agency "on how the CIA could maintain its undercover espionage mission in a culture of increasing government leaks and demands for greater public accountability and openness." According to Fiorina, she advised the agency to be "as transparent as possible, about as much as possible".

==== Changes to HP culture ====
Fiorina's predecessor at HP had pushed for an outsider to replace him because he believed that the company had become complacent and that consensus-driven decision making was inhibiting the company's growth. Fiorina instituted three major changes shortly after her arrival: replacing profit sharing with bonuses awarded if the company met financial expectations, a reduction in operating units from 83 to 12, and consolidating back-office functions.

Fiorina faced a backlash among HP employees and the tech community for her leading role in the demise of HP's egalitarian "The HP Way" work culture and guiding philosophy, which she felt hindered innovation. Because of changes to HP's culture, and requests for voluntary pay cuts to prevent layoffs (subsequently followed by the largest layoffs in HP's history), employee satisfaction surveys at HP – previously among the highest in America – revealed "widespread unhappiness" and distrust, and Fiorina was sometimes booed at company meetings and attacked on HP's electronic bulletin board.

According to The Fiscal Times, Fiorina and others have argued that she "laid the groundwork for some of HP's progress under her successors", and that she shook the culture at HP so that it could compete in the Internet Age.

==== iPod+HP ====
In January 2004, Fiorina announced an agreement with Apple founder Steve Jobs for the iPod+HP – a co-branded iPod sold through HP's retail channels. As part of the agreement, HP was forbidden from selling a competitor to the iPod until August 2006 and HP agreed to pre-install iTunes on every computer sold. Two days before Fiorina announced the HP+iPod, Jobs announced a new product, the iPod mini, catching Fiorina off guard. HP did not sell the newer versions of the iPod in a timely fashion, leaving them to sell an outdated device for several months. In addition, Apple began selling its own iPods through the same retail channels. As a result, at the peak of the program, iPod+HP sales represented only a small portion of total iPod sales. In July 2005, soon after Fiorina resigned as CEO, her successor Mark Hurd ended HP's agreement with Apple, within days of taking office, a "highly symbolic decision" that was well-received as a return to innovation by HP.

Steven Levy, writing in 2015 on the agreement, wrote that "Steve Jobs blithely mugged her and HP's shareholders. By getting Fiorina to adopt the iPod as HP's music player, Jobs had effectively gotten his [iTunes] software installed on millions of computers for free, stifled his main competitor, and gotten a company that prided itself on invention to declare that Apple was a superior inventor. And he lost nothing ..."

==== Layoffs ====
In January 2001, HP laid off 1,700 marketing employees. In June 2001, Fiorina asked employees to either take pay cuts or use their allotted vacation time to cut additional costs, resulting in more than 80,000 people signing up and saving HP US$130 million. Despite these efforts from employees, in July Fiorina announced that 6,000 jobs would be cut, the biggest reduction in the company's 64-year history, but those cuts would not actually occur until after the Compaq merger was announced. In September 2001, Fiorina said she intended to cut an additional 15,000 jobs in the event of a merger with Compaq.

In all, Fiorina laid off 30,000 U.S. employees. According to PolitiFact, those 30,000 layoffs were "as a result of the merger with Compaq...." By 2004 the number of HP employees was about the same as the pre-merger total of HP and Compaq combined, and that 2004 number included roughly 8,000 employees of other companies acquired by HP since 2001. Altogether, under Fiorina's leadership, HP had a net gain of employees, including employees from mergers as well as hires in countries outside the United States.

In 1999, when Fiorina became CEO of HP, the company had 84,800 employees. After the merger with Compaq, the company had a total of 145,000 employees worldwide. At the time of her resignation in 2005, after HP had acquired several other companies, HP had about 150,000 employees.

==== Forced resignation ====
HP's revenue doubled and the rate of patent filings increased due to mergers with Compaq and other companies during Fiorina's stint as CEO. In addition, HP's cash flow increased by 40%, to around $6.8 billion. However, the company underperformed by a number of other metrics: there were no gains in HP's net income despite a 70% gain in net income of the S&P 500 over this period; the company's debt rose from US$4.25 billion to US$6.75 billion; and its stock price fell by 50%, exceeding declines in the S&P 500 Information Technology Sector index and the NASDAQ. By contrast, stock prices for IBM and Dell fell by 27.5% and 3% respectively during this time. The Compaq acquisition was not as transformative as Fiorina and the board had envisioned: in the merger proxy, they had forecasted that the PC division of the merged entities would generate an operating margin of 3.0% in 2003, while the actual figure was 0.1% in that year and 0.9% in 2004.

In 2004, HP fell dramatically short of its predicted third-quarter earnings, and Fiorina fired three executives during a 5 AM telephone call. In early January 2005, the Hewlett-Packard board of directors discussed with Fiorina a list of issues that the board had regarding the company's performance and disappointing earning reports. The board proposed a plan to shift her authority to HP division heads, which Fiorina resisted strongly. A week after the meeting, the confidential plan was leaked to The Wall Street Journal. According to BusinessWeek's Ben Elgin, directors were also concerned about the board's inability to work effectively with Fiorina.

Less than a month later, the board brought back Tom Perkins and forced Fiorina to resign as chair and chief executive officer of the company. The company's stock jumped 6.9 percent on news of her departure, adding almost three billion dollars to the value of HP in a single day.

In her book Tough Choices, she referred to board members' behavior as "amateurish and immature". Larry Sonsini, who investigated the leak related to Fiorina's forced resignation, described the board in his report to Fiorina as being "dysfunctional."

On May 13, 2008, HP, under then-Chief Executive Mark Hurd, confirmed that it had reached a deal to buy Electronic Data Systems, the largest since the Compaq purchase. The price was a reported $12.6 billion. At the time of the announcement, Loren Steffy of The Houston Chronicle suggested that the EDS acquisition after Fiorina's tenure was evidence that her failed plan to acquire part of Pricewaterhouse Coopers was justified.

Under the company's agreement with Fiorina, which was characterized as a golden parachute by Time magazine, and Yahoo! Finance, Fiorina received a severance package valued at US$21 million, which consisted of 2.5 times her annual salary plus bonus and the balance from accelerated vesting of stock options. According to Fortune magazine, Fiorina collected over US$100 million in compensation during her short tenure at HP.

=== Business leadership image ===
In 2003, Fiorina was named by Fortune Magazine the most powerful woman in business, a position she held for five years. In 2004, she was included in the Time 100 ranking of "most influential people in the world today" and named tenth on the Forbes list of The World's 100 Most Powerful Women. In 2005, The Wall Street Journal described Fiorina as the epitome of "an alluring, controversial new breed of chief executive officers who combine grand visions with charismatic but self-centered and demanding styles". The same year, Wharton School professor Michael Useem opined, "Fiorina scored high on leadership style, but she failed to execute strategy".

Following her forced resignation from HP, several commentators ranked Fiorina as one of the worst American (or tech) CEOs of all time. In 2008, InfoWorld grouped her with a list of products and ideas that flopped, declaring that her tenure as CEO of HP was the sixth worst tech flop of all time, and characterizing her as the "anti-Steve Jobs" for reversing the goodwill of "geeks" and alienating existing customers. During Fiorina's tenure as CEO, HP leased or purchased five planes, including two Gulfstream IVs, to replace four aging aircraft, only one of which had the range to fly overseas. One Gulfstream IV, acquired at a cost of US$30 million and available for Fiorina's "exclusive" use, became a rallying point among HP employees who complained of Fiorina's expensive self-promotion and top-down managerial style during a time of company layoffs. Jeffrey Sonnenfeld of Yale School of Management said in August 2015 that problems with Fiorina's leadership style were what caused HP to lose half its value during her tenure.

Others have defended Fiorina's business leadership decisions and viewed the Compaq merger as successful over the long term.

== Transition of career and public persona ==
=== Autobiography ===
In October 2006, Fiorina published an autobiography entitled Tough Choices, about her career and her views on issues, what constitutes a leader, how women can thrive in business, and the role technology will continue to play in reshaping the world. A review by NPR Books noted that "The book covers Fiorina's rise and fall as America's most powerful female executive."

Earlier books by others about Fiorina's role in the merger at HP included: Backfire, (2003) by Peter Burrows, and Perfect Enough: Carly Fiorina and the Reinvention of Hewlett-Packard, (2003), by George Anders. A 2003 review by The New York Times of these books said, "Two new books about the deal and its main champion – Hewlett-Packard's chair and chief executive officer, Carly Fiorina – show that there is much investors can glean immediately from this merger."

=== Other organizational involvement ===
In October 2007, Fiorina signed with the Fox Business Network as a business commentator.

After resigning from HP, Fiorina served on the board of Revolution Health Group and computer security company Cybertrust in 2005. In 2006, she became a member of the board of directors for chip maker Taiwan Semiconductor Manufacturing Company (TSMC), but resigned from that board on November 30, 2009, with the company saying this was "because she planned to devote her full time and energy" to her Senate campaign. She had attended 17% of the TSMC directors' meetings in 2009 and 20% of TSMC directors' meetings in 2008. She served as a member of the MIT Corporation from 2004 to 2012. She was a member of the Foundation Board of the World Economic Forum (WEF) in 2005. She is an honorary fellow of the London Business School. In July 2012, Governor Bob McDonnell of Virginia appointed her to the James Madison University Board of Visitors. In 2015, Fiorina received an honorary degree and delivered the commencement address at Southern New Hampshire University.

Fiorina is the chair and CEO of Carly Fiorina Enterprises, a business and charitable foundation. A spokesperson described Fiorina Enterprises as "...a nonprofit enterprise that helped Fiorina structure speaking engagements and appearances while providing the public with information about her activities..." The San Francisco Chronicle reported that, as of July 2009, she had "never registered her Carly Fiorina Enterprises to conduct business in California, either with the California secretary of state or the clerk of Santa Clara County, where Fiorina lives."

== Nonprofit work ==
=== Good360 ===
In April 2012, Fiorina became chair of Good360, a 501(c)(3) nonpartisan nonprofit organization in Alexandria, Virginia, which helps companies donate excess merchandise to charities. Good360 has been consistently ranked by Forbes magazine as one of the top 10 most efficient charities, and ranked as the 33rd largest charity in the United States. Good360 is "the largest product donation marketplace in the world. We help companies take excess inventory and then distribute that excess inventory to 37,000 vetted charities around this country."

In September 2014, Fiorina led an effort by Good360 to get American corporations "to help combat the Ebola virus in West Africa – by donating specific items". She left the organization when she declared her presidential candidacy in 2015.

=== One Woman Initiative ===
Fiorina served as Fund Chair of One Woman Initiative (OWI), a partnership between the private sector and government agencies, including the United States Agency for International Development (USAID) and the United States Department of State (DoS). OWI describes itself as "An International Women's Empowerment Fund" that seeks to "support existing initiatives in Muslim majority countries and countries with large Muslim populations" and "focus on key empowerment issues including entrepreneurship, political leadership, and the rule of law". OWI said it would raise funds in order to give grants to achieve these objectives, with contributions managed through a separate section 501(c)(3) designated organization.

In June 2009, USAID announced that OWI grants totaling over US$500,000 had been made to grassroots organizations in Azerbaijan, Egypt, India, Pakistan, and the Philippines.

=== Opportunity International ===
On February 14, 2013, Opportunity International announced a partnership with Fiorina and OWI to provide financial resources, education and training to two million women living in poverty. Fiorina was referred to as Global Ambassador to Opportunity International. On May 4, 2015, Opportunity International announced that Fiorina was resigning from the Board after the announcement of her presidential candidacy.

=== Fiorina Foundation ===
Fiorina is the chair and CEO of the Fiorina Foundation, a charity that has donated to causes including Care-a-Van for Kids, a transportation program to aid seriously ill children; and the African Leadership Academy, an educational institution in South Africa. Fiorina's website states that the foundation "enables corporations, spokeswomen entrepreneurs and philanthropists alike to address some of the world's most challenging issues".

The San Francisco Chronicle reported that "Records also show that her Fiorina Foundation has never registered with the Internal Revenue Service or the state attorney general's charitable trust division, which tax-exempt charities are required to do. A spokeswoman commented that "Fiorina and her staff believed the foundation was not required to file with the IRS because it accepted no outside contributions and donated only her personal wealth to worthy causes."

=== Colonial Williamsburg Foundation ===
In 2017, Fiorina joined the board of trustees for the Colonial Williamsburg Foundation. In December 2020, she was elected the chair of the board of trustees. In April of 2026, Fiorina was named CEO of The Colonial Williamsburg Foundation.

== Political career ==
Fiorina has never held public office, but said that her status as an outsider is a positive attribute; in her opinion, professional politicians have failed to deliver to the American people. In a 2015 interview with Fox News, she stated that "82% of the American people now think we need people from outside the professional political class to serve in public office."

=== Republican National Committee fundraising chair and 2008 campaign ===
In 2006, Fiorina worked as an advisor for Republican senator John McCain's presidential campaign. The New York Times noted that while she did not want to run, she was an executive who could possibly become a candidate for president. On March 7, 2008, Fiorina was named fundraising chair for the Republican National Committee's "Victory" initiative. She was reportedly a "point person" for the McCain campaign on issues related to business and economic affairs. Fiorina's severance package from Hewlett-Packard in 2005 was viewed by some as a political liability during the campaign. Referring to the McCain campaign, Newsweek described Fiorina as "the most prominent surrogate on economics issues in any of the major campaigns."

The day McCain chose Sarah Palin as his running mate, she defended the selection of Palin as McCain's running mate and said that Palin was being subjected to sexist attacks, a charge she repeated a few days later in response to one of the Saturday Night Live parodies of Sarah Palin.

When asked during a radio interview on September 15, 2008, whether she thought Palin had the experience to run a major company like Hewlett-Packard, Fiorina answered "No, I don't. But that's not what she's running for. Running a corporation is a different set of things." When questioned about her answer, she answered, "I don't think John McCain could run a major corporation." Fiorina further said that none of the candidates on either ticket had the experience to run a major corporation. After media coverage of Fiorina's comments, she "disappeared from public view" and planned television appearances were cancelled, although she continued to chair the party's fundraising committee. Responding to Barack Obama's victory over Hillary Clinton in the Democratic primary, Fiorina sought to attract more women to the Republican camp by praising Clinton's effort.

==== Vice presidential campaign speculation ====
In early 2008, Fiorina was referred to in media sources as a potential vice presidential candidate, In discussing the possibility of Fiorina becoming McCain's running mate, political analyst Stuart Rothenberg pointed out her potential downside, stating that she "is rather easy to sketch out" because she would "become a talking point for Democrats" who would focus on Fiorina's generous severance package from when she had left HP and her management style. Rothenberg concluded that Fiorina was "like a dream come true" for Democratic opposition researchers.

=== Defense Business Board and Central Intelligence Agency ===
Fiorina performed unpaid service on the Defense Business Board, which looked at staffing issues, among others, at The Pentagon.

Fiorina spent two years leading the Central Intelligence Agency's External Advisory Board, from 2007 to 2009, and became chair of that board, when the board was first created in 2007 by then-CIA director Michael Hayden during the George W. Bush administration.

=== 2010 U.S. Senate candidacy for California ===
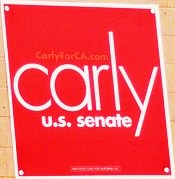
Fiorina's campaign sign during her candidacy for U.S. Senator from California

On November 4, 2009, Fiorina formally announced her candidacy in the 2010 Senate election in a bid to unseat incumbent Democrat Barbara Boxer. Fiorina's campaign in the Republican primary for that seat received a number of endorsements, including one from Sarah Palin in the form of a Facebook note. Her campaign ad about Republican rival Tom Campbell featuring a "Demon Sheep" – created by Fiorina advertising consultant Fred Davis III – generated largely negative international publicity. After the ad went viral, the California Democratic Party created a parody of the ad depicting Fiorina herself as a demon sheep.

On June 8, 2010, Fiorina won the Republican primary election for the Senate with over 50 percent of the vote, beating Campbell and state assemblyman Chuck DeVore.

A Los Angeles Times search of public records indicated Fiorina had failed to vote in most elections. Fiorina responded: "I'm a lifelong registered Republican but I haven't always voted, and I will provide no excuse for it. You know, people die for the right to vote. And there are many, many Californians and Americans who exercise that civic duty on a regular basis. I didn't. Shame on me."

The Los Angeles Times noted that Fiorina had conservative positions on certain social issues. She personally opposed abortion, except in cases of rape, incest, or endangerment of the mother's life. As a private citizen, she stated that she voted for Proposition 8, which defined marriage as a union between one man and one woman. Following an August 4, 2010, federal court ruling that Proposition 8 was unconstitutional, Fiorina expressed disagreement with the ruling, saying that California voters spoke clearly against same-sex unions when a majority approved the proposition in 2008. She stated that she opposed litmus tests for Supreme Court nominations and did not favor a federal "personhood" amendment. Fiorina had called global warming a "serious issue" but said that the science surrounding it is inconclusive, saying "I think we should have the courage to examine the science on an ongoing basis." In a campaign ad, Fiorina likened Boxer's concerns over global warming to worrying about "the weather." Fiorina accepted contributions from the coal industry as well as Koch Industries. Fiorina opposed the cap-and-trade legislation supported by Boxer, and thought efforts to control greenhouse gases would cost 3 million jobs and are "massively destructive".

In financial disclosures, Fiorina identified her net worth at between US$30 million and US$120 million, and by October 22, Fiorina had contributed a total of US$6.5 million to her own race.

Sarah Palin was set to appear at a GOP fundraiser two weeks ahead of the November 2 election, but neither Meg Whitman (the Republican nominee for Governor of California) nor Fiorina – both big-name Republicans – planned to attend. The prediction was that Palin's primary endorsement would jeopardize her general election candidacy.

Boxer won the general election, defeating Fiorina 52.2% to 42.2%.

=== "Unlocking Potential Project" PAC ===
Fiorina launched and developed a political action committee (PAC) known as "Up-Project" (short for "Unlocking Potential Project") from 2011 to 2014. The stated mission of the organization was "...to engage women with new messages and new messengers by focusing on personal interactions with voters and going beyond the traditional methods of identifying, persuading and turning-out voters..." In November 2014, The Washington Post reported that "Helping Fiorina chart her political future are consultants Frank Sadler, who once worked for Koch Industries, and Stephen DeMaura, a strategist who heads Americans for Job Security, a pro-business advocacy group in Virginia"; The Up-Project website lists Fiorina as chair.

=== American Conservative Union Foundation and CPAC ===
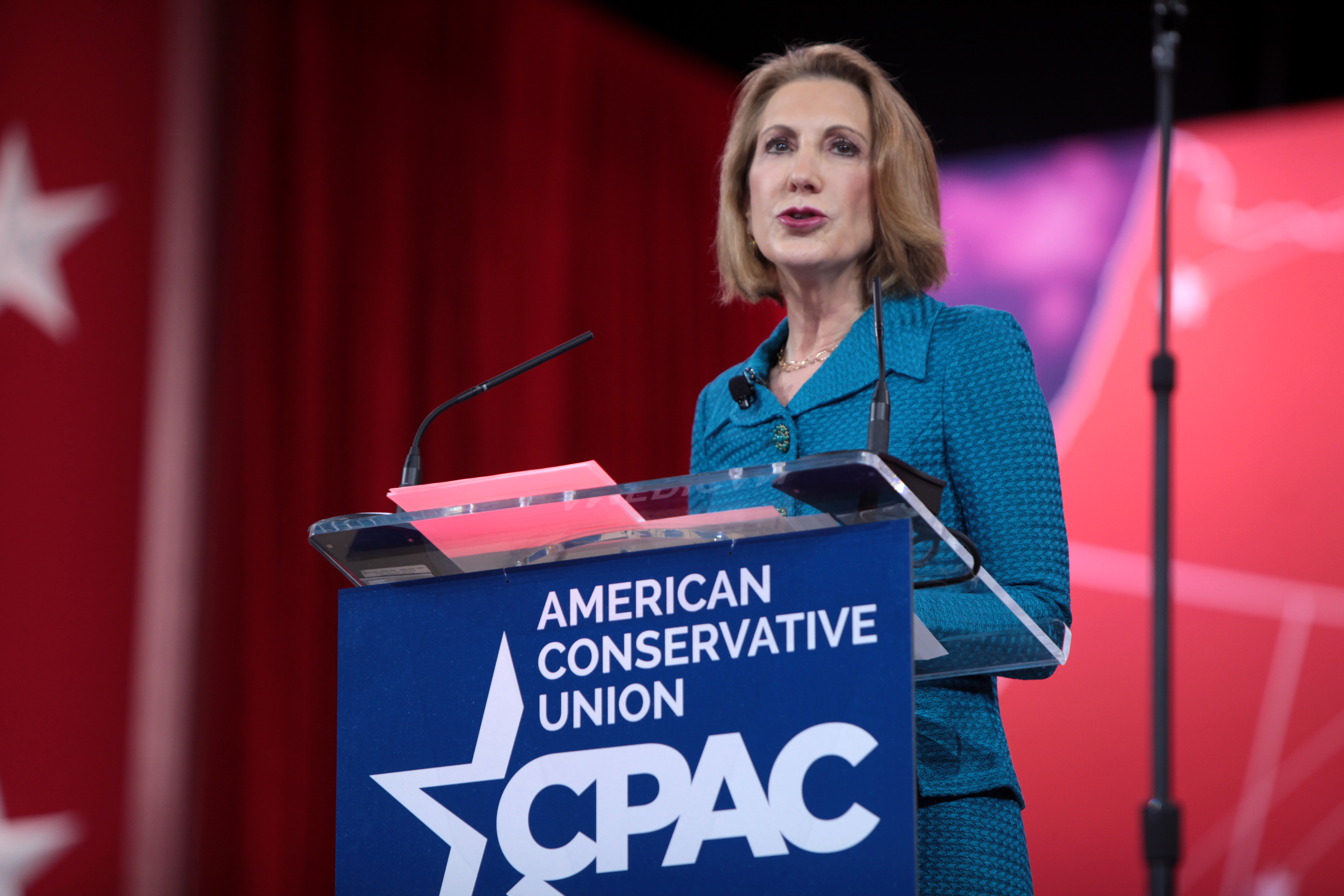
Carly Fiorina speaking at the 2015 Conservative Political Action Conference (CPAC), in National Harbor, Maryland, February 26, 2015

On October 1, 2013, Al Cardenas, chair of the American Conservative Union (ACU), appointed Fiorina as chair of the American Conservative Union Foundation (ACUF), the ACU's educational arm. The ACU is a conservative 501(c)(4) organization, while the ACUF is its affiliated 501(c)(3) foundation, which organizes the annual Conservative Political Action Conference (CPAC).

Fiorina was co-chair of CPAC 2014, making a speech at the conference. At CPAC 2015, Fiorina again made a speech at the conference. It was speculated that Fiorina would announce her candidacy for the Republican nomination for president in that speech, but Fiorina did not, instead making her official announcement months later, on May 4, 2015, in a television and promotional video, therein repeating her talking points from CPAC and including an attack on Democratic candidate Hillary Clinton.

Fiorina resigned as ACU Foundation chair in early 2015.

=== U.S. presidential campaign, 2016 ===
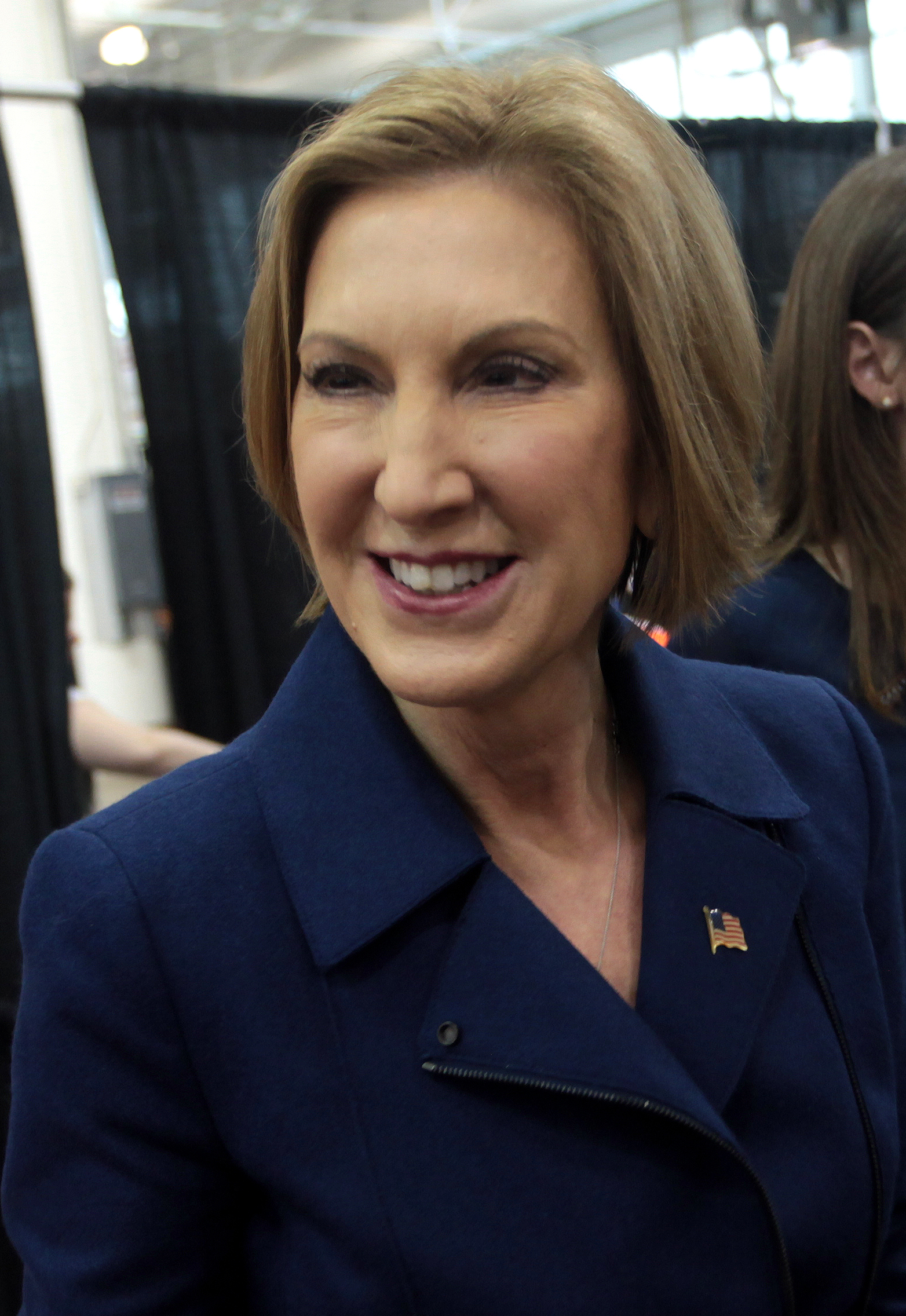
Carly Fiorina at the 2015 Iowa Growth & Opportunity Party at the Iowa State Fairgrounds in Des Moines, Iowa, October 2015

Fiorina ruled out running for the U.S. Senate in 2016, but refused to rule out running for president in 2016 or Governor of California in 2018. In November 2014, The Washington Post reported that Fiorina was "actively exploring" a run for president. Her business background and status as the only CEO and the only woman in a "sea of suited men" were mentioned as positives, though Republican strategists pointed to her poor 2010 Senate performance, unpaid campaign debt, and dismissal from HP as "considerable challenges" to her prospects. In March 2015, Fiorina said on Fox News Sunday that there was a "higher than 90% chance" that she would run for president in 2016.

On May 4, 2015, Fiorina announced her candidacy during an interview on Good Morning America, with George Stephanopoulos. Fiorina entered the race with immediate criticism of Hillary Clinton. It was reported that the GOP saw Fiorina as "the tip of the spear" in its attack of the Clinton campaign because she was uniquely positioned to isolate her criticisms of Clinton from claims of gender bias.

Shortly after Fiorina announced her entry into the 2016 presidential race, in a replay of her 2010 senatorial race, the social media and editorial outlets questioned her tenure as HP's CEO as a basis for her run for president, focusing around US job cuts and offshoring that Fiorina directed during her tenure at HP, and contrasting it with the high compensation bonuses she received from the company. Campaign Manager, Sarah Isgur Flores, deflected the job cut criticism saying, Fiorina "worked hard to save as many jobs as possible."

On August 6, Fiorina participated in Fox News's first GOP debate. Failing to qualify for one of the Fox News prime-time debate slots, she was relegated to the debate airing earlier the same day. Fiorina's performance led news sources to conclude she had won the early debate. During the debate, she remarked, "'The highest calling of leadership is to challenge the status quo and unlock the potential of others'". Following the debate, several pundits correctly predicted that her polling numbers would surge. On August 9, Fiorina reported an uptick in fundraising support. In an online poll by NBC and SurveyMonkey on August 10, Fiorina came in fourth of the seventeen Republican contenders with 8% of the sampled Republican primary voters saying they would support her in a primary or a caucus, a gain in support of six points from previous polling data.

At another debate in September, hosted by CNN, Fiorina misrepresented a Planned Parenthood sting video, describing a grisly scene which was not in the video. She was sharply criticized for this in the media; the gaffe consumed much of the post-debate coverage. Planned Parenthood responded that she had lied, saying it was "not the first time Carly Fiorina has lied." PolitiFact chief editor Angie Drobnic Holan mentioned this particular lie in a December 2015 comparison of the presidential candidates with regard to their truthfulness. In the comparison, Fiorina scored 50% falsehood, the sixth worst performance.

The National Review pointed out her role as foil to Hillary Clinton, saying "Carly Fiorina is no doubt getting attention because of her unique background, but more and more people are staying to listen because she has something fresh to say", and that "Fiorina also seems to relish the role of being the most pointed critic of Hillary Clinton.... She contrasts her background as a 'problem solver' with Clinton's record as a professional politician." The Nation commented, "With so-called women's issues poised to play an unprecedented role in the upcoming election, Republicans need someone who can troll Hillary Clinton without seeming sexist." Meg Whitman, then CEO of Hewlett-Packard, stated that in her opinion Fiorina was not qualified to be President of the United States, stating that a business background is important but that having worked in government is also important, and that "it's very difficult for your first role in politics to be President of the United States".

As part of her financial disclosures related to her candidacy, Fiorina reported a net worth of US$59 million, with US$12 million in income in 2013. International Business Times estimates Fiorina's net worth between US$30 million and US$120 million.

Her performances in early debates for the Republican primary nomination, particularly her rebukes of front-runner Donald Trump in the September 16, 2015, debate, earned her a significant spike in the polls from 3% to 15% post-debate, but her polling numbers dropped to 4% by October, and to 3% in December. On February 10, due to weak results in the Iowa and New Hampshire primaries, Fiorina announced that her campaign was suspended. On March 9, 2016, Fiorina endorsed Texas Senator Ted Cruz for President, saying she was "horrified" by Donald Trump and that Cruz was the only candidate that could stop him.

=== 2016 U.S. vice presidential campaign ===
On April 27, 2016, Cruz announced that he would choose Fiorina as his vice presidential running mate if he were selected as the party's presidential nominee. Fiorina responded by stating that she was "'"very proud, very humbled and honored'" to be chosen by Cruz. Cruz deployed Fiorina to appear at campaign events in Indiana in advance of the Indiana Republican primary. Six days later, after having lost the Indiana primary, Cruz suspended his campaign, making Fiorina's vice-presidential candidacy the shortest in modern American history.

Fiorina received one electoral college vote for vice president from a faithless elector in Texas.

== Political positions ==
When she first entered politics as a Senate candidate in November 2009, Carly Fiorina was "considered to be a moderate Republican with little history on social issues". Her positions changed during her run for Senate and her run for president in 2016. In 2017, she described herself as conservative. FiveThirtyEight, a non-partisan organization which analyzes candidates' positions and conducts polling, considered Fiorina to be within the moderate and establishment wings of the GOP.

In 2020, Fiorina endorsed Joe Biden's presidential campaign due to her disapproval of President Donald Trump.

=== Social issues ===
Fiorina is anti-abortion. She expressed support for legislation to ban abortions 20 weeks after fertilization, with an exception for cases of rape, incest, or danger to the life of the mother. In 2010, she said that Roe v. Wade was settled law, but later reversed that position. Fiorina supported overturning Roe v. Wade, the 1973 Supreme Court ruling that legalized abortion in the United States, allowing states to set their own abortion policies. She does support embryonic stem-cell research if the embryos were not created for that purpose.

In a February 2015 speech, Fiorina acknowledged the scientific consensus that climate change is real and caused by human activity, but expressed skepticism that government can affect the issue, and has "implied that targeting the coal industry will not solve the problem".

Fiorina said in May 2015 that "drug addiction shouldn't be criminalized" and cited "decriminalizing drug addiction and drug use" as an example of a successful reform. Fiorina opposes the legalization of marijuana, but says that she believes in states' rights, and that as president she will not enforce the federal ban on marijuana in Colorado, where voters have legalized marijuana as a matter of state law.

While running for president, Fiorina has been a critic of the Common Core State Standards. In September 2015, Fiorina said: "No Child Left Behind, Race to the Top, Common Core – they're all big, bureaucratic programs that are failing our nation." This was a reversal of her position on federal education policies during her 2010 campaign for U.S. Senate from California. In that campaign, Fiorina issued a position paper in which she "strongly advocated for metric-based accountability in schools" and "praised No Child Left Behind as setting high standards, and Race to the Top for using internationally-benchmarked measures."

In California, Fiorina supported the DREAM Act, which would allow children brought to the U.S. by their parents when they were under the age of 16 to secure permanent U.S. residency and a path to citizenship, if they graduate from college or serve in the armed forces.

Fiorina opposed same-sex marriage, but supported civil unions. She later said that she hoped the nation would support Obergefell v. Hodges, the decision legalizing same-sex marriage, and also respect individuals' consciences. In November 2009, during a The Wall Street Journal interview, Fiorina said that she voted in favor of Proposition 8, a California ballot proposition that banned same-sex marriage in that state. During the 2010 United States Senate election in California, Fiorina was endorsed by GOProud, a gay conservative organization. In 2010, Fiorina stated that she supported the Defense of Marriage Act, but also supported civil unions. She supported the repeal of Don't Ask Don't Tell. In 2015, Fiorina reaffirmed her support for civil unions with the same government benefits accorded to married persons. She does not support a constitutional amendment to ban gay marriage. In 2017, Fiorina headlined the 40th anniversary of Log Cabin Republicans, a political action committee which supports LGBT rights. In her address, she said, "Everyone has to be free to be who they are."

Fiorina believes employers should decide whether they should provide paid maternity leave to their employees and it should not be mandated by the government, noting that some companies in the private sector are already doing so. She also pointed out that HP, while she was CEO, offered paid maternity leave.

=== Foreign and military policy ===
Fiorina has criticized the international nuclear agreement with Iran, saying that Iran is "at the heart" of evil in the Middle East; that the agreement is a "flawed deal"; and that "there is a lot of reason to be suspicious" of it. Fiorina also suggested that verification provisions in the agreement were insufficient and that approval of the agreement by the international community and the U.S.'s negotiating partners was suspect because Russia and China have an interest in gaining access to Iran's economy and the European Union "has negotiated, frankly, a number of weak deals." Fiorina opposes the normalization of U.S.-Cuba relations, telling Hugh Hewitt that if elected she would close the U.S. embassy in Havana.

In a January 2015 discussion with an Iowa political blogger, Fiorina said of the Chinese: "They're not terribly imaginative. They're not entrepreneurial. They don't innovate. That's why they're stealing our intellectual property." Fiorina supports keeping the Guantanamo Bay detention camp in Cuba open. In September 2015, Fiorina "offered a vigorous defense of CIA waterboarding", a tactic used by the United States during the George W. Bush-era war on terror. Fiorina's interest in national security issues led to her name being floated for the position of director of national intelligence by Donald Trump during the 2016 transition period.

In a September 16, 2015 Republican presidential debate, Fiorina was asked how she would deal with Russia and its prime minister, Vladimir Putin, if she were elected. Fiorina replied, "'Having met Vladimir Putin, I wouldn't talk to him at all. We've talked way too much to him. What I would do, immediately, is begin rebuilding the Sixth Fleet, I would begin rebuilding the missile defense program in Poland, I would conduct regular, aggressive military exercises in the Baltic states. I'd probably send a few thousand more troops into Germany. Vladimir Putin would get the message'".

=== Economic and fiscal Issues ===
Fiorina was critical of the Affordable Care Act (ACA) health care reform legislation during the debate in 2009 that led to the act's passage. Fiorina has supported repealing the ACA during both her 2010 Senate run in California, and in her 2015 presidential campaign. Fiorina has called the law "deeply flawed" and a "vast legislative overreach." Fiorina supports an individual mandate that would require individuals to carry "high-deductible 'catastrophic care' insurance plans and use federal dollars to subsidize state-based high-risk pools to provide care for those who otherwise cannot afford it."

Fiorina has stated that "there is no constitutional role for the federal government to be setting minimum wages" and that the minimum wage "is a classic example of a policy that is best carried out in the states" because economic conditions in New Hampshire vary significantly from more expensive economic conditions in Los Angeles or New York. Florina also believes that raising the federal minimum wage would "hurt those who are looking for entry-level jobs".

Fiorina opposes net neutrality rules adopted by the Federal Communications Commission (FCC), and has said she would "roll back" that policy: "Regulation over innovation is a really bad role for government." Fiorina has repeatedly criticized the rules, arguing that "the FCC just issued – without anyone commenting on it or anyone voting on it – 400 pages of new regulations over the Internet. It's not good, it's not helpful."

Fiorina "generally believes that reducing government regulations helps to spur the economy". She has condemned the Dodd–Frank Wall Street Reform and Consumer Protection Act, saying in April 2015 that "We should get rid of Dodd-Frank and start again." Fiorina has been questioned by some in the media for stating that not "a single regulation has ever been repealed." Glenn Kessler of The Washington Post said that, "Important parts of the economy have been deregulated in recent decades. While the repeal of a specific rule is relatively rare, there are certainly examples."

Fiorina favors lowering tax rates, simplifying the tax code, and closing loopholes that she says mostly benefit wealthy taxpayers. Florina has said "the government needs to take in less tax money, not more." During her 2010 Senate campaign, Fiorina "called for eliminating the estate tax and capital gains taxes for investments in small businesses, and lowering marginal tax rates." Fiorina opposes proposals to increase the federal gas tax or state gas taxes in order to fund the Highway Trust Fund, asserting in a February 2015 The Wall Street Journal op-ed that "Any gas tax hike, big or small, will harm American families and hurt economic growth." Fiorina opposed the federal stimulus package of 2009 intended to create short-term job growth and invest in infrastructure, education, health, and renewable energy, calling it a waste of taxpayer money. Fiorina has said she would cut the pay of federal workers and base their compensation on performance. She also advocates zero-based budgeting for the federal budget, which would start the annual budgeting process for each department from a baseline of zero.

Fiorina favors expanding the H-1B visa program. Writing in opposition to proposals she considered protectionist in a 2004 The Wall Street Journal op-ed, Fiorina said that while "America is the most innovative country," it would not remain so if the country were to "run away from the reality of the global economy." Fiorina said to Congress in 2004: "There is no job that is America's God-given right anymore. We have to compete for jobs as a nation."

== Personal life ==
Fiorina (then Cara Carleton Sneed) married Todd Bartlem, a Stanford classmate, in June 1977. They divorced in 1984.

In 1981, she was introduced to AT&T executive Frank Fiorina, who told her on their third date that she would one day be running the company. She married him in 1985; it was the second marriage for both. Fiorina has said that they wanted to have children together but "that wasn't God's plan". Frank Fiorina took early retirement from AT&T in 1998 at age 48 to travel with and support his wife in her career.

Frank Fiorina had two daughters, Traci and Lori Ann, from his first marriage. Their mother, Patricia, was awarded custody of both children following the divorce. Carly helped her husband raise his daughters. Lori Ann struggled with alcoholism, prescription drug addiction and bulimia. She died in 2009 at age 35.

In February 2009, Fiorina was diagnosed with stage II breast cancer. She underwent a double mastectomy at Stanford Hospital in March 2009, and later underwent chemotherapy (which caused her to temporarily lose her hair) and radiation therapy. She was given "an excellent prognosis for a full recovery." In late 2009, during her campaign for the United States Senate seat held by Barbara Boxer, Fiorina humorously told a group of supporters: "I have to say that after chemotherapy, Barbara Boxer just isn't that scary anymore."

According to the financial disclosures filed by Fiorina's campaign in June 2015, she and her husband have a combined net worth of $59 million. Fiorina has released the income tax returns that she and her husband jointly filed in 2013 and 2012; in those years, the Fiorinas reported income of almost $2 million and $1.3 million, respectively.

Between 2005 and 2012, Fiorina and her husband owned a condominium in the Georgetown neighborhood of Washington, where they lived for roughly half the year; they sold the condo for $5.3 million. At the time of the 2010 U.S. Senate election, Fiorina and her husband lived in Los Altos Hills, California, a San Francisco Bay area suburb. As of 2015, Fiorina and her husband lived in a home in the Washington, D.C., suburb of Mason Neck, Virginia, overlooking the Potomac River. The house and grounds were valued at $6.6 million in 2015.

Discussing her religious faith, Fiorina has said that she is a Christian. Specifically, she said that "she was raised Episcopalian but is not a regular churchgoer."

== See also ==
- List of female United States presidential and vice presidential candidates
- List of Republicans who opposed the Donald Trump 2016 presidential campaign
- List of Republicans who opposed the Donald Trump 2020 presidential campaign
- List of Republicans who opposed the Donald Trump 2024 presidential campaign
- Republican Party presidential candidates, 2016

== Bibliography ==
- Anders, George (2003). Perfect Enough: Carly Fiorina and the Reinvention of Hewlett-Packard. New York: Penguin Group, 2003. ISBN 1591840031.
- Burrows, Peter. Backfire: Carly Fiorina's High-Stakes Battle for the Soul of Hewlett-Packard. Wiley, 2003. ISBN 0471267651.
- Fiorina, Carly (2006). Tough Choices: A Memoir. Portfolio Hardcover, 2006. hardcover: ISBN 159184133X, abridged audiobook: ISBN 0143059076
- Fiorina, Carly (2015). Rising to the Challenge: My Leadership Journey, Penguin Group (Sentinel), ISBN 1591848032.

Business positions
Preceded by Lew Platt	President of Hewlett-Packard; 1999–2005	Succeeded by Mark Hurd
Preceded by Lew Platt	Chief Executive Officer of Hewlett-Packard; 1999–2005	Succeeded by Robert Wayman
Preceded by Richard Hackborn	Chair of Hewlett-Packard; 2000–2005	Succeeded by Pat Dunn
Party political offices
Preceded by Bill Jones	Republican nominee for U.S. Senator from California (Class 3); 2010	Vacant Title next held by Mark Meuser; 2022
