= CBS International Business School =

Business school in Germany

Coordinates: 50°55′28″N 6°56′57″E

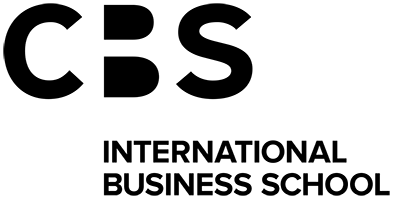
- Other name: CBS
- Motto in English: Creating tomorrow
- Established: 1993
- President: Prof. Dr. Anja Karlshaus
- Students: 3000 (2022)
- Location: Cologne, Germany
- Website: Official website

The CBS International Business School (CBS) is a state-recognised, private business school which emerged in 2020 from the individual brands Cologne Business School (CBS) and European Management School (EMS). At its locations in Cologne, Mainz, Potsdam, Aachen, Brühl, Neuss and Solingen, it offers approximately 3,000 students its predominantly English-language business management study courses with the academic degrees Bachelor of Arts, Bachelor of Science, Master of Arts, Master of Science and MBA. The CBS Cologne Business School GmbH is the responsible body of the university.

== Profile ==
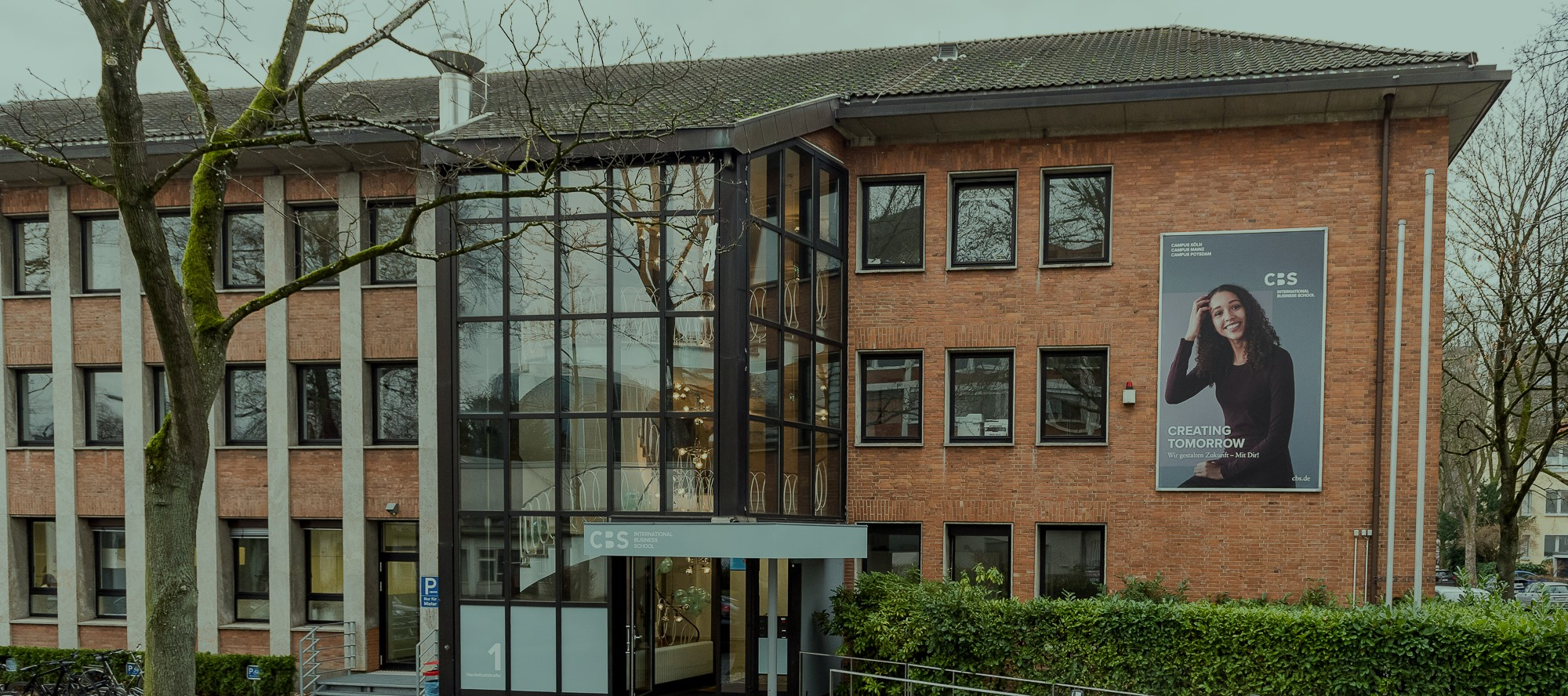
Main entrance of the campus Cologne

The CBS International Business School was founded in 1993 under the name "International Campus". It specialises in practice-oriented management study programmes according to international standards. Its portfolio includes on-site study programmes in German or English, which can be studied full-time, extra-occupationally or part-time.

The practical relevance of the courses of study is guaranteed by, among others, lecturers from business and science, who transfer their practical knowledge directly into teaching. In addition, practice-oriented teaching content such as business projects and business simulation games, in which ethical issues and theories of sustainable management are discussed, are firmly anchored in the curricula.

The study program portfolio of CBS International Business School comprises around 40 study programmes at Bachelor, Master and MBA level. They can be studied full-time, part-time, or extra-occupationally. All study programmes at the CBS International Business School are regularly accredited by the trinational accreditation agency FIBAA (Foundation for International Business Administration Accreditation) and the German Council of Science and Humanities. Institutionally, the CBS has also been accredited by the International Accreditation Council for Business Education (IACBE).

The university also has numerous memberships in national and international associations, such as the Association to Advance Collegiate Schools of Business (AACSB), the Central and East European Management Development Association (CEEMAN), the Dr. Jürgen Foundation and the Principles for Responsible Management Education (PRME) Initiative. Since 2018, Prof. Dr. Elisabeth Fröhlich, President of the CBS International Business School, has held the chairmanship of the Cologne Science Round Table (KWR), whose aim is to highlight the numerous scientific and economic potentials of the region with its diverse range of offers and to facilitate networking between Cologne's universities and research institutions.

== History ==
The development of the CBS International Business School is closely connected to the European Business and Language Academy, which was founded in 1908 as a private academy at the location of the current Cologne campus in the southern part of Cologne. In the winter semester 1993/1994, the Europäische Wirtschafts- und Sprachenakademie (EWS) introduced courses of study according to the Bachelor system for the first time under the new name "International Campus", which made it one of the first providers of these degrees in Germany alongside the University of Bochum. In 1998, the study programmes of this business studies bachelor model were the first in Germany to be accredited by FIBAA. One year later, the university was renamed "Cologne Business School - International Campus", which can still be found in the acronym "CBS" of the university name "CBS International Business School".

The CBS first expanded in 2006 and founded the European Management School (EMS) as its second location, today's "Campus Mainz". Since 2016, the CBS has been part of the Stuttgart Klett Group and was awarded IACBE accreditation (International Accreditation Council for Business Education) in 2018.

With the re-design of the new brand in 2020, the CBS International Business School presents itself as a joint university group with an enhanced study profile and with the new slogan "Creating tomorrow". Since August 2020, the CBS International Business School has had a further campus in Potsdam-Babelsberg.

In 2022, CBS took over the Management and Technology university division of European University of Applied Sciences (EUFH), which also belongs to Klett, as a result of which the locations Brühl, Aachen, Neuss and Solingen were newly added and the number of students and study programs approximately doubled.

== Milestones of CBS International Business School ==
1993: Foundation of Cologne Business School (CBS) in Cologne

1998: FIBAA accreditation of all study programmes

2006: Foundation of European Management School (EMS) in Paris France

2016: Integration into the Klett Group

2018: IACBE accreditation as the first German university

2020: Merger of Cologne Business School and European Management School to form CBS International Business School

2020: Foundation of the Potsdam campus

2022: Fusion between CBS International Business School and European University of Applied Sciences (EUFH)

== Internationality ==
The internationalisation of the university is one of the core goals of the CBS. This is not only reflected in the international orientation of its English-language degree programmes but also in a broad international network of currently 130 partner universities worldwide (as of February 2020). The CBS also has an Erasmus Charter for Higher Education (ECHE), which makes it part of the Erasmus+ programme funded by the EU Commission.

In the curricula of the English-language BA and BSc programmes, the semester abroad is integrated as a compulsory part of the programme. The semesters abroad are made possible via a mobility window in the 5th semester of the degree course and are completed at the CBS partner universities. Internships abroad are also supported and promoted by the CBS Career Service. The student body of the CBS is characterised by a high degree of diversity with a share of over 20% of international students from almost 75 different nations across all study courses. The integration of the international students is promoted via close academic and also social support through consultation hours, various events and German courses at the CBS.

== Further facilities of CBS International Business School ==
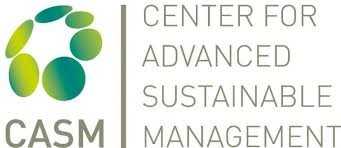
Logo of the Center for Advanced Sustainable Management

=== Center for Advanced Sustainable Management ===
The Center for Advanced Sustainable Management (CASM) was founded at the CBS in 2016 from the Dr. Jürgen Meyer Endowed Chair for International Business Ethics and Sustainability. Since its foundation, the CASM has been headed by Prof. Dr. René Schmidpeter and Patrick Bungard. The CASM deals with questions of corporate social responsibility, international business and corporate ethics, sustainability as well as social innovation. It integrates and promotes research and education on relevant sustainability and CSR topics within the university. The CASM also aims to generate an active transfer of knowledge between academic research and business practice through corporate cooperation. The Center has developed strong relationships with key companies in the field of sustainable management as well as with chambers of commerce, ministries of economics, NGOs, think tanks and thought leaders at local and international level. Together they are working to make sustainability the new standard in business practice and in sustainable management education. CASM aims to drive the change towards systemically sustainable management by training young leaders, imparting knowledge and bringing together people who believe in the same way of thinking.

Since 2018, CASM has been a partner in various international research cooperation that focus on the development and piloting of innovative teaching formats for sustainable management and their effectiveness.

CASM is a founding member of the international WISE Institute. WISE is based at the IEDC-Bled School of Management and aims to serve professionals in the field of sustainable business (including business ethics, CSR and environmental responsibility) in emerging economies through practice-oriented research, education and networking. The aim is to develop an ongoing research and education agenda to advance integrated sustainability and facilitate the implementation of best practices in emerging economies. Further partners are the National Institute for Innovation Management at Zhejiang University in China and the University of Stellenbosch Business School in South Africa.

In addition, since 2019 CASM has been a member of the ESSSR (European School of Sustainability Science & Research) and the NBS SSC (Network for Business Sustainability: Sustainability Centers Community).

In 2018, CASM, in cooperation with the Humboldt University, the Hamburg School of Business Administration and other national and international partners, hosted the 8th International Conference on Sustainability and Responsibility on the topic of "Responsible Leadership in Times of Transformation" for the first time. More than 400 participants from around 40 nations attended the CSR and Sustainability Conference. In addition, the 5th Responsible Management Education Research Conference took place in the run-up to the conference, which in 2018 was under the patronage of the PRME Regional Chapter DACH and dealt with the topic "Leadership Development for Advancing the Implementation of the Sustainable Development Goals".

From August 2021 to February 2023 the CASM was headed by Prof. Dr. Cristian R. Loza Adaui, who joined CBS International Business School as holder of the Professorship for Sustainability Management and Corporate Social Responsibility. During this period the CASM was responsible for the activities related to four international Erasmus+ Projects:

- ISSUE - Innovative Solutions for Sustainability in Education
- EFFORT - EFFectiveness Of Responsible Teaching
- CEIP- Circular Economy in Practice
- TRUST-Finance - TRansdisciplinary course on sUSTainable FINANCE

Additionally the CASM coordinated the activities of the project 1Uni - 1Book, dedicated to the topic of Gender Data Gap: #TheOtherHalf - Making Invisible Women Visible! which was financed by the Stifterverband.

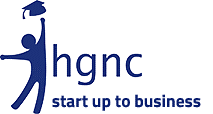
Logo of hochschulgründernetz cologne e. V.

=== University start-up network cologne e.V. ===
In 2018, CBS International Business School took over the office of the hochschulgründernetz cologne e. V.(hgnc), which is represented by Prof. Dr. Ulrich Anders as Managing Director and Flora Carlhoff as Project Manager. The hgnc offers a wide range of consulting and information services for prospective founders from the Cologne region, which are free of charge for students, graduates and scientists from Cologne universities and non-university research institutions. With 20 partners from universities and institutions in Cologne (including innovation centres, banks, the Cologne Chamber of Commerce and Industry and the City of Cologne), the association, which was founded in 1998, has developed into the first point of contact and expert network in Cologne.

== Research ==
At the core of the research work at CBS are the two areas of sustainable management and digitisation, which are expressed in the concept of "Corporate Digital Responsibility". Other current research clusters include: "Education & Methods", "Business Transformation", "Entrepreneurship & Innovation", "Leadership, People & Organisation" and "Financial Markets & Rising Economics", all of which are considered in the context of globalisation.

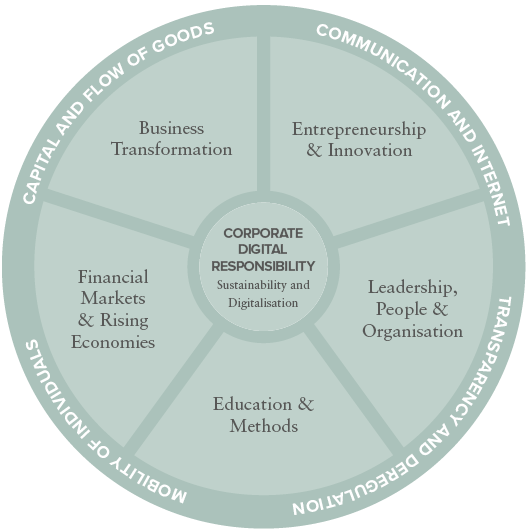
The new research structure of CBS International Business School

The cluster "Business Transformation" comprises all steps of an entrepreneurial value chain and is dedicated to questions of how these value chain steps must be transformed or realigned through sustainable management and digitisation. "Entrepreneurship & Innovation", as another cluster, is dedicated to the establishment of innovative digital and sustainable business models. "Leadership, People & Organisation" focuses in particular on the constantly increasing demands on the management culture, personnel management practices and organisation of a company. The cluster "Financial Markets & Rising Economies" plays a special role in the context of sustainable management and digitalisation. The fast-growing emerging economies are facing central challenges in terms of climate protection, energy consumption, or the protection of human rights, while shaping their growth and role in a globalised economy. Finally, the cluster "Education & Methods" is of particular importance as a base for research. In addition to implementing integrated curricula for sustainable management and digitisation, educational institutions are faced with the challenge of implementing new methods for research and teaching as well as finding instruments that document learning success in a sustainable manner.

Research projects at the CBS:

- German Academic Exchange Service (DAAD):

From Navigational Data to Ontologies - Knowledge Integration for Cataloguing Ethical Scenarios in Autonomous Vehicles (KI-ES-AV) - Research project applied for within the DAAD Programme "PPP Programme for Project-Related Personal Exchange" together with researchers from the AGH University of Science and Technology in Kraków

- German Research Foundation (DFG):

Module on business management professions for biochemists, for Graduate College of the University of Cologne, as part of a DFG application of the University of Cologne, AG Prof. Dr. Jan Riemers, Department of Chemistry

- German Research Foundation (DFG):

DFG-NCN (Beethoven)-Projekt “The effects of non-financial reporting legislation on human resource management practices and corporate governance in Germany and Poland”. Analyzing the impacts of Directive 2014/95/EU

- German Research Foundation (DFG):

Entrepreneurship programme "Bench-to-Business" for graduate college of the University of Cologne, as part of a DFG application of the University of Cologne, AG Prof. Dr. Meerholz, Department of Chemistry (focus on physical chemistry). Pre-proposal positively reviewed, DFG inspection expected in March 2020.

- ERASMUS+ STRATEGIC PARTNERSHIPS 2018:

Cooperation for Innovation and the Exchange of Good Practices: ISSUE - Innovative Solutions for SUstainability in Education (2018-1-HU01-KA202-047730)

- ERASMUS+ STRATEGIC PARTNERSHIPS 2019:

Cooperation for innovation and the exchange of good practices: EFFORT - EFFectiveness Of Responsibility Teaching (KA203-135267E4)

- National Science Center Poland:

Research grant awarded by the National Science Center Poland, body of the Ministry of Higher Education in Poland, to support internationalization of project title: "Changes in competitiveness and the intensity of international economic cooperation of the new EU Member States in the years 2000-2014" (January 2016 - December 2019) in cooperation with professors from the Warsaw School of Economics (Prof. dr. habil. Elzbieta Czarny) and Krakow School of Economics (Prof. Dr. habil. Edward Molendowski)

- Research Data Alliance (RDA) Europe:

"SDG Ambassador Grant

== Professors (selection) ==
- Michael Schwertel, Media Producer
- Klemens Skibicki, Economic Historian
- Anja Karlshaus, Economist
- Desmond Wee, Professor of Culture, Consumption & Mobilities
- Rembert Horstmann, Professor of Marketing and Sales
- Ingvill C. Ødegaard, Professor of International Politics

== Members of the Advisory Board (selection) ==
- Gregor Berghausen, Managing Director, IHK Düsseldorf
- Thomas Bischof, Chairman, Gothaer Allgemeine Versicherung
- Marcus Flory, VP Technology & Innovation, Digital Factory Deutsche Telekom
- Dr. Michael Fübi, Chairman, TÜV Rheinland AG
- Andreas Janetzko, CEO, TBA Logistics
- Klaus Laepple, tourism industry entrepreneur
- Dr. Tanja Lingohr, CEO, ICON-INSTITUTE
- Birgit Oßendorf-Will, Group HR Director, Ströer Group
- Ulf C. Reichardt, CEO, NRW.Energy4Climate
- Prof. Dr. Walter Tokarski, Rector (ret.), Deutsche Sporthochschule
- Markus Voss, Global CIO & COO, DHL Supply Chain

== Known students/graduates ==
- Thomas Bachem (*1985), German entrepreneur, software developer and venture capitalist
- Christian Miele, Investor at e. ventures, President of the Federal Association of German Startups
- Gleb Tritus, Entrepreneur, Investor, Managing Director at Lufthansa Innovation Hub
- Christopher Muhr, Entrepreneur, Co-Founder Citydeal (Groupon International), Investor
