= Christopher Muhr =

German serial entrepreneur and business

- Born: Bonn, North Rhine Westphalia
- Education: Cologne Business School, HHL Leipzig Graduate School of Management
- Occupation: Entrepreneur
- Known for: Founder of Groupon (CityDeal), Endy, McMakler

Christopher Muhr is a German serial entrepreneur with investments and board seats in startups in Europe, Israel and North America. He is best known for co-founding Groupon International (Citydeal), Canadian Mattress brand Endy, prop tech startup McMakler and scaling Auto1 in the role of COO.

== Personal life ==
Muhr was born in Bonn, North Rhine-Westphalia. He graduated from Cologne Business School with a degree in Business Administration. After graduation Muhr spent two years of development work in microfinance in Namibia and Uganda. Muhr also holds an MSc in management from Handelshochschule Leipzig (HHL) and Instituto de Empresa (IE). After receiving his degree at HHL, Muhr pursued a short career in M&A at NIBC in Frankfurt prior to joining Rocket Internet in Berlin. In December 2009 he founded CityDeal and started his career in tech.

== Career ==
In his last role he served as COO for Auto1 Group one of Europe's most valuable startups to date and drove the companies international expansion. Muhr is also known as a founder of Endy, which was sold to Sleep Country in November 2018 as one of Canada's largest-ever e-commerce acquisitions, and as a co-founder of Groupon International via the acquisition of his company Citydeal which was acquired in 2010 in Groupon's largest acquisition to date.

During his time at Auto1 he together with his partners from Warpspeed Ventures founded McMakler which today is considered one of Europe's fastest growing prop tech startups. In 2011 Muhr was voted 35th in The Wired 100. He has been featured in various publications including the Financial Times, BBC News, Manager Magazin, FAZ and is a regular a speaker at events like DLD.

=== Auto1 Group ===
In his last venture Muhr was acting as chief operating officer at Auto1 Group, overseeing their international expansion. In 2018 Auto1 had over 4,000 employees with operations spanning across 30+ countries and revenue of over Euro 2.9 billion. Auto1 was valued at about 2.9 billion Euro ($3.4 billion) when SoftBank Group Corp.'s Vision Fund invested in 2018. In August 2020 Bloomberg reported that the company is undertaking steps to prepare for IPO.

=== Endy ===
In 2015, Muhr co-founded Canadian mattress brand Endy. In under four years, Endy became Canada's major online mattress retailer and was sold in 2018 for $89 Million to Sleep Country Canada. The company has generated over $150M in sales and has won numerous awards including being named Fastest Growing Retailer in Canada by Maclean's and Canadian Business.

=== Groupon ===
End of 2009 Muhr started Citydeal, later on also referred to as Groupon International, with initial operations in Germany, the UK and France. Funded by the Samwer brothers, Rocket Internet, and Holtzbrinck Ventures the voucher deal company quickly expanded into further European markets. The company was acquired by Groupon in 2010, just five months after its launch. Although no confirmed figures were released of the deal, it was reported that the sale of Citydeal was between $100M USD and $300M USD. At the time of acquisition, Citydeal employed 600 people and had presence in 80 cities in 16 countries.

In 2011, ahead of Groupon's IPO, Muhr moved to the Chicago headquarters joining the executive management team around Andrew Mason and taking on the position as Senior Vice President Sales to spearhead growth in Groupon's North American business.

Muhr served as the company's Senior Vice President of Sales until September 2012 before he took on Groupon's International Business as SVP EMEA. Under Muhr, North American revenues grew 81% year-over-year.

=== Patient21 ===
In January 2019, Muhr and Nicolas Hantzsch co-founded the healthcare startup Patient21. Patient21 spent two years focused on refurbishing dental clinics with upgraded technology and software with planned expansion into other healthcare practice verticals.
