= Gettis =

Gettis is a surname. Notable people with the surname include:

- Adam Gettis (born 1988), American football player, cousin of David
- Byron Gettis (born 1980), American baseball player
- David Gettis (born 1987), American football player
- James Gettis (1816–1867), American lawyer and judge
- Mike Gettis, Canadian businessman and entrepreneur
