= Muhr (disambiguation) =

Muhr is a place in Austria.

Muhr may also refer to:

== People ==
- Christopher Muhr, German businessman
- Robin Muhr (born 1995), Israeli Olympic equestrian

== Other ==
- Muhr am See, a place in Bavaria, Germany
- Muhr Awards, film awards given at the Dubai International Film Festival
