= Sleep Country =

Sleep Country may refer to:

- Sleep Country Canada, a Canadian mattress retailer
- Mattress Firm, an American mattress retailer with Sleep Country USA as an alternative name
- Cascades Amphitheater, formerly the Sleep Country Ampitheater
