= Cracking Up =

Cracking Up may refer to:

- Cracking Up (1977 film), an American anthology sketch comedy film starring Harry Shearer, Michael McKean, David Lander, Edie McClurg, and more
- Cracking Up (1983 film), an American comedy directed by and starring Jerry Lewis
- Cracking Up (1994 film), an American comedy-drama directed by and starring Matt Mitler
- Cracking Up (TV series), a 2004 American sitcom
- "Cracking Up" (song), a 1998 song by the Jesus and Mary Chain
- "Cracking Up", a 1979 song by Nick Lowe from Labour of Lust
- "Cracking Up: From a Rising Star to Junkie despair in 1000 days" is a book on cocaine addiction by Gordon Lownds

== See also ==
- Laughter
