= Christine Magee =

Canadian businesswoman (born 1959)

- Born: November 7, 1959 (age 67); Toronto, Ontario, Canada
- Education: University of Western Ontario
- Occupation: Businesswoman/ national anthem singer(jets)

Christine Magee (born November 7, 1959) is the co-founder and president of Sleep Country Canada. In October 1994, she co-founded the company with Stephen K. Gunn and Gordon Lownds. By 2004, the company had expanded to 89 stores, with over 600 employees and operations in three provinces. Magee is on the board of directors for McDonald's Canada, Cott Corporation and Telus.

== Career ==
In 1982, Magee graduated from the Richard Ivey School of Business in London, Ontario with a BA honours in business administration (HBA). Her first job after university was with Continental Bank as a commercial accounts manager. In 1985 she joined the National Bank of Canada as senior manager of corporate and commercial lending.

In 1994, Magee and her business partners launched the first four Sleep Country locations in Vancouver. In an interview with Business Edge News Magazine, Gord Lownds said, "We had known Christine in her days as a banker at National Bank, where she was actually a lender for a couple of buyout transactions we had done. For a number of reasons, we were looking for a third partner who longer-term could take over and run the business on a permanent basis. She fit the bill on a number of fronts. I was convinced that she wasn't a lifelong banker because she had more entrepreneurial spirit than I would expect in a banker."

The chain expanded into Toronto, opening 19 stores in 1996. Over the next year, more stores were opened in Southern Ontario and Calgary. By 2001, the chain had over 100 stores in six regional markets and controlled an estimated 40% of market in regions where it operated. Currently, there are over 200 stores and 17 distribution centres spanning 8 provinces, including, British Columbia, Alberta, Saskatchewan, Manitoba, Ontario, Nova Scotia, New Brunswick and Quebec (under the name Dormez-vous?).

In 2006, Magee was the United Way of Greater Toronto's Retail Chair, and a member of the Women presidents' Organization, the Rouge Valley Health System, and the Richard Ivey School of Business' Advisory Council and the Entrepreneurship Council.

== Awards ==
- 1997 – Recognized as one of Canada's Top 40 Under 40
- 1998 – The Financial Post named her and Stephen Gunn the Ontario Entrepreneur of the Year, Retail/Wholesale
- 1999 – Named the Consumers' Choice Toronto Business Woman of the Year
- 2003 – Guest Speaker at Annual Influential Women in Business Speaker Series
- 2005 – Inducted into the Canadian Retail Hall of Fame, Retail Council of Canada
- 2006 – Recipient of CIRAS Henry Singer Award for exceptional leadership in the retailing and services sectors
