= Stephen K. Gunn =

Canadian businessman

Stephen K. Gunn is Executive Co-Chairman and co-Founder of Sleep Country Canada Inc, which he co-founded with Christine Magee and Gordon Lownds. As of June 2013, the company has 201 stores across Canada and 43 stores in the US.

== Early life ==
Gunn grew up in Montreal and Kingston. He completed an honours BSc in Electrical Engineering from Queen's University and an MBA from the Richard Ivey School of Business (1981).

== Career ==
After university he joined McKinsey & Company as a Management Consultant (1981–1987). In 1987, he co-founded and was the President of Kenrick Capital, a private equity business. In October 1994, he co-founded Sleep Country Canada with Christine Magee and Gordon Lownds. He is currently on the board of directors for Dollarama, Cara Operations and Golf Town. He succeeded Larry Rossy as chairman of the board of directors of Dollarama on March 29, 2018.

== Personal life ==
Gunn is married with a daughter and 3 sons. He enjoys golf, sailing and skiing.

== Awards ==
- 1998- Financial Post named him and Christine Magee the Ontario Entrepreneur of the Year, Retail/Wholesale
- 2003- Inducted into the Canadian Retail Hall of Fame, Retail Council of Canada
- 2004- Inducted into the Canadian Marketing Hall of Legends
- 2006- Recipient of CIRAS Henry Singer Award for exceptional leadership in the retailing and services sectors
