= Ann Livermore =

Former Executive Vice President at Hewlett-Packard

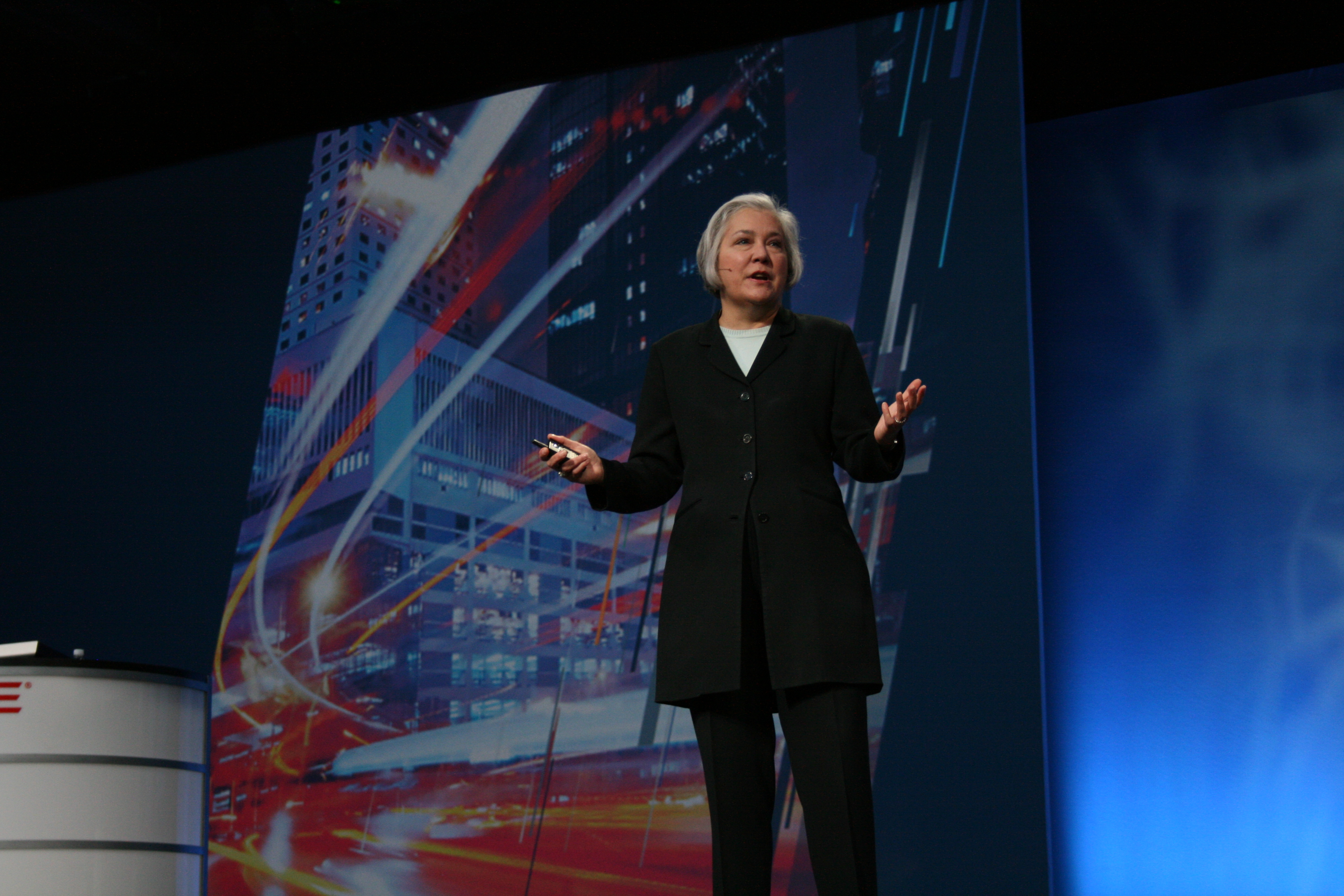
- Livermore in 2010
- Born: Ann Martinelli Livermore; August 23, 1958 (age 68); Greensboro, North Carolina, US
- Education: University of North Carolina at Chapel Hill, Stanford University
- Occupation: Company director

Ann Martinelli Livermore (born 23 August 1958) is a former Executive Vice President at Hewlett-Packard, where from 2004 until June 14, 2011, she led the HP Enterprise Business business unit of HP. After being relieved of day-to-day operations, she was elected to the board of directors of HP. At the time, she was a 29-year veteran of the company and among existing senior management, the longest-service executive.

== Life and career ==
=== Early life ===
Livermore was born in Greensboro, North Carolina. She was the valedictorian at her North Carolina high school. She holds a bachelor's degree in economics from the University of North Carolina at Chapel Hill, where she was a Morehead Scholar, as well as an MBA from Stanford University.

=== Hewlett-Packard ===
Livermore came to HP right out of graduate school. Livermore has been at HP since 1982 and has worked in a variety of sales, marketing, and research and development jobs before being elected a corporate vice president in 1995.

In 1997, Livermore was elected to the board of directors of United Parcel Service.

In 1998, when head of HP's software and services business, the company's top executives agreed to put themselves through a 360-degree evaluation. Livermore observed:

"I learned that I'm a very, very well-controlled executive, but that my employees like when I go off the handle every once in a while, you know, show my human side - It reinforced that leadership means touching people's hearts as well as their brains, so since then I haven't worried so much about keeping my lid on."

Livermore has been credited with steering HP away from its decentralized culture and hardware mentality and was the brains behind HP's E-services strategy. When HP CEO Lewis Platt announced in March 1999 that he would step down, Livermore confirmed that she wanted the job. Insiders say Livermore was the only internal candidate who made the short list, but, in July 1999, HP made the former Lucent Technologies executive Carly Fiorina the first female CEO of a Dow 30 company.

Beginning in 2004, Livermore led HP's Technology Solutions Group (renamed HP Enterprise Business in 2009), a US$30 billion-plus business that encompassed storage and servers, software and services. The products and services from this organization serve HP's business customers of all sizes in more than 170 countries. Once thought of as a costly distraction, this group is now seen as a source of future growth. Livermore's name was mentioned as a possible candidate to take over at HP when Carly Fiorina was ousted in February 2005 as CEO. Mark Hurd from NCR Corp. was instead picked to be HP's new CEO.

In the wake of HP pressuring employees to accept a 5% pay cut, it was revealed that Livermore's 2008 total compensation amounted to $20,551,493. In the same year, Mark Hurd as CEO reported his compensation to be $42,514,524.

On May 13, 2008, Hewlett-Packard Co. confirmed that it had reached a deal with Electronic Data Systems to acquire the company for $13.9 Billion. The deal was completed on August 26, 2008. EDS became an HP business unit and was renamed "EDS, an HP company." Ronald A. Rittenmeyer remained at the helm, reporting to Ann Livermore until his retirement.

With Mark Hurd's August 2010 departure, Livermore was once again a possible candidate for the top job, however lost out to former SAP CEO, Léo Apotheker.

Livermore was named in Fortune and Forbes annual ranking of America's leading businesswomen. As of 2011, her business unit was $60 billion which was half of total HP revenues and encompassed two-thirds of total HP staff.

On June 14, 2011, Livermore was replaced as head of HP Enterprise, as her top lieutenants, Dave Donatelli, software head Bill Veghte, and global sales leader Jan Zadak, were to report directly to the CEO. She was reportedly forced out since total services revenue had grown just 1% in the most recent fiscal year, despite the earlier acquisition of EDS in 2008.

== Personal life ==
In 2005 Livermore had a kidney transplant for an undisclosed ailment.
