= Furniture Bank =

- Founded: 1998 (Toronto, Ontario, Canada)
- Founder: Sister Anne Schenck
- Type: non-profit, social enterprise
- Purpose: Women and children, immigrants, refugees, homeless
- Location(s): 25 Connell Court; Unit 1 Toronto, Ontario, Canada
- Region served: Greater Toronto Area
- Key people: Dan Kershaw, executive director
- Website: www.furniturebank.org

Furniture Bank is a charitable organization and social enterprise that has been helping people in the Greater Toronto Area establish their homes since 1998. Furniture Bank accepts gently used furniture and household goods and redistributes them to people in marginalized communities. Donors can drop off furniture or use the fee-based pick-up service to make a contribution, and are offered an in kind charitable tax receipt for the value of the donated goods.

The organization’s focus is on helping new immigrants and refugees, abused women and children, and the formerly homeless furnish their homes. Furniture Bank works alongside more than 70 community agencies and shelters, such as Streets to Homes, YMCA Shelters, and the Fred Victor Centre, that refer clients in need to access the services.

With 5 trucks on the road, Furniture Bank is able to provide furniture to more than 5,000 clients a year. In 2012, the organization diverted 1,526 metric tons of furniture from ending up in a landfill.

Furniture Bank is a member of the Furniture Bank Association of North America.

== History ==
Sister Anne Schenck, one of the Sisters of St. Joseph and a retired teacher and principal, established Furniture Bank in Toronto in 1998 and continues to be involved with the Board. With help from Jack Layton, she was able to secure rent-free space from the City of Toronto and established 200 Madison Avenue as Furniture Bank’s first home. The organization based operations out of this warehouse until 2008 when the building was to be converted into housing, forcing Furniture Bank to move.

Furniture Bank has relocated a few times, but now has a permanent home in the west end of Toronto. The move to Etobicoke allowed the organization to meet the growing demands of the operation and transform the warehouse into a true showroom. Furniture Bank has been located at 25 Connell Court since 2012.

As of May 2014, Furniture Bank has served over 60,000 people in need.

== Programs ==
=== Furniture Link ===
Furniture Link functions as the logistics arm of Furniture Bank by providing pick-up and delivery services to donors and clients of the organization. This social enterprise is run much like a private company, but is driven by a social mission. Furniture Link is supported through grants from the United Way's Toronto Enterprise Fund and the Ontario Trillium Foundation. Revenue from operations are re-invested in the organization to provide funds for staffing and programming with a goal to subsidize operations and make the charity self-sustaining.

=== Leg Up ===
Furniture Bank operates an employment program called Leg Up, which provides individuals facing barriers to employment with training and work opportunities. The job skills program has a focus on new immigrants and at-risk youth, with participants working a variety of different paid placements throughout Furniture Bank’s operations.

== Events ==
=== Chair Affair ===
The signature fundraising event at Furniture Bank is the Chair Affair. The annual event consists of a live and silent auction on chairs selected from the Furniture Bank warehouse and decorated by Toronto designers. Previous designers include Steven Sabados and Chris Hyndman of Steven and Chris, and Heidi Richter and Paul Lafrance of Decked Out. Jack Layton, Susan Hay, and Olivia Chow have acted as hosts or auctioneers in the past.

== Volunteering ==
Volunteers play a big role in the organization, helping to move furniture and assist clients in selecting items. In addition to having regular volunteers, Furniture Bank often hosts corporate groups who volunteer for the day.

== See also ==
- Furniture
- Social Enterprise
- Homelessness in Canada
- Poverty in Canada
- Charitable Organization
- Waste Diversion
- Gifts in kind
