= Rajen Ruparell =

- Born: 6 June 1983 (age 43); Calgary, Alberta, Canada
- Education: University of Toronto; Imperial College Business School
- Occupations: Entrepreneur, investor

Rajen Ruparell (born June 6, 1983) is a Canadian entrepreneur, investor, board director and philanthropist. He is best known as the Founder and Chairman of Endy and as Co-Founder of Groupon International via acquisition of his company Citydeal.

== Personal life ==
Ruparell was born in Calgary, Alberta, Canada. He pursued his undergraduate at the University of Toronto and holds an MSc in Management from the Imperial College Business School in London. Prior to founding Citydeal, Ruparell worked in his family business of auto dealerships and real estate, and had a brief career in venture capital at Oxford Capital Partners, before leaving to pursue his own Internet ventures. Ruparell serves as Executive Director of the Rajen Ruparell Foundation, focusing on major donations in education, basic child needs, the arts, and women empowerment. In 2017, he was reported to have paid $100,000 at a fundraiser charity auction for a private magic session with David Blaine, in support of children’s education in Haiti.

== Career ==
Ruparell is the Founder of Endy, which was sold to Sleep Country in November 2018 as one of Canada’s largest-ever e-commerce acquisitions, and a Co-Founder of Groupon International via the acquisition of his company Citydeal which was acquired in 2010 in Groupon’s largest acquisition to date. Ruparell was called one of the “Best Young Entrepreneurs in the World” in an interview with Larry King in 2017, the same year he was named EY Entrepreneur of the Year finalist. He has been featured in various publications including the Financial Times, Bloomberg, Reader’s Digest, CBC, The Globe & Mail and Fortune. Ruparell serves on the board of Clearbanc and was a pre-IPO investor in Twitter and Spotify.

=== Endy ===
In 2015, Ruparell co-founded and financed Canadian mattress brand Endy, where he served as Chairman, Founder, and Majority Shareholder. In under four years, Endy became Canada’s leading online mattress retailer and was sold in 2018 for $89 Million to Sleep Country Canada. Ruparell serves as the Executive Chairman of the newly formed joint entity created through the acquisition. The company has generated over $500m in sales and has won numerous awards including being named Fastest Growing Retailer in Canada by Maclean’s and Canadian Business.

=== Groupon ===
Citydeal, also referred to as Groupon International, was a European-based deal company co-founded by Ruparell in the United Kingdom and Groupon’s entry into Europe. It was a startup funded by the Samwer brothers, Rocket Internet, and Holtzbrinck Ventures which Ruparell joined early in its development. The company was acquired by Groupon in 2010, just five months after its launch. Although no confirmed figures were released of the deal, it was reported that the sale of Citydeal was between $100M USD and $300M USD. At the time of acquisition, Citydeal employed 600 people and had a presence in 80 cities in 16 countries. In 2011, ahead of Groupon’s IPO, Ruparell and his co-founders moved to the Chicago headquarters to spearhead growth in Groupon’s North American business. He was charged by the board with founding Groupon Goods, which diversifies from their core local business Groupon. At the time of Ruparell’s announced departure, Groupon Goods generated billings of nearly $1.5 Billion USD.
