= Gordon Lownds =

Canadian businessman

Gordon Lownds (born 1947/48), co-Founder of Sleep Country Canada and Listen Up! Canada, is a Canadian entrepreneur.

Gord Lownds was born and raised in Toronto, Ontario, Canada. He earned a Bachelor of Arts degree in Philosophy from York University and an MBA from the University of Toronto. In an interview with Business Edge News Magazine, Lownds describes his early career, "I started working at 15 as a barker at a carnival, and found out at that point that I enjoyed working. I was also a professional rock musician for a couple of years, playing bass and guitar. Then, I started my legitimate business career with Consumers Distributing in 1970 in a warehouse and worked my way up to the management team there."

He moved towards work in consulting and investment banking. He managed the strategic management practice at DMR & Associates. Later Lownds became a partner at Paradigm Consulting Inc. In 1988, he left that company to start Kenrick Capital, a boutique investment banking firm, with a few other partners. In 1994, he co-founded Sleep Country Canada with Christine Magee and Stephen K. Gunn. He assumed the chairman and CEO position of that company for four years and saw the chain grow from nothing to over 50 stores across Canada. After leaving Sleep Country Canada in 1998 he spent a year traveling around Costa Rica and the Cayman Islands. In 2000, he developed and funded Red Apple Entertainment. In 2003, he co-founded Listen Up! Canada, a hearing aid retailer.

Gordon is a member of the University of Waterloo Stratford Campus Advisory Board.

== Personal life ==
In an August 18, 2025 Vancouver Sun newspaper article, Gord Lownds — 77 at the time — admitted that in 1996 (at age 48) he was fighting a crack cocaine addiction in his book titled Cracking Up: From a Rising Star to Junkie despair in 1000 days. Lownds stated that he was divorced around this time and his family were living in Toronto and relates that he:

"got mixed up with Annabelle, a Seattle stripper with an out-of-control coke habit and libido that never quit. One day, during yet another huge fight about Annabelle getting clean, Annabelle asked Lownds to smoke crack in a bid to better understand the grip it had on her. Lownds did. And he liked it....Six months later, he had moved from smoking crack to shooting up."

Lownds states that after three years of addiction and spending "$700,000 spent on drugs, Lownds decided he could no longer keep up the double life. He left Vancouver and signed in to a rehab facility in Toronto." His harrowing experience with crack cocaine addiction inspired him to write his book. Lownds stresses that:

"What shocked me was that I couldn’t control it, I couldn’t stop it on a dime, and I thought I would be able to. Talk about sort of a gut punch, because I’ve always been in control, able to solve problems,"
