= Endy Sleep =

Canadian e-commerce company

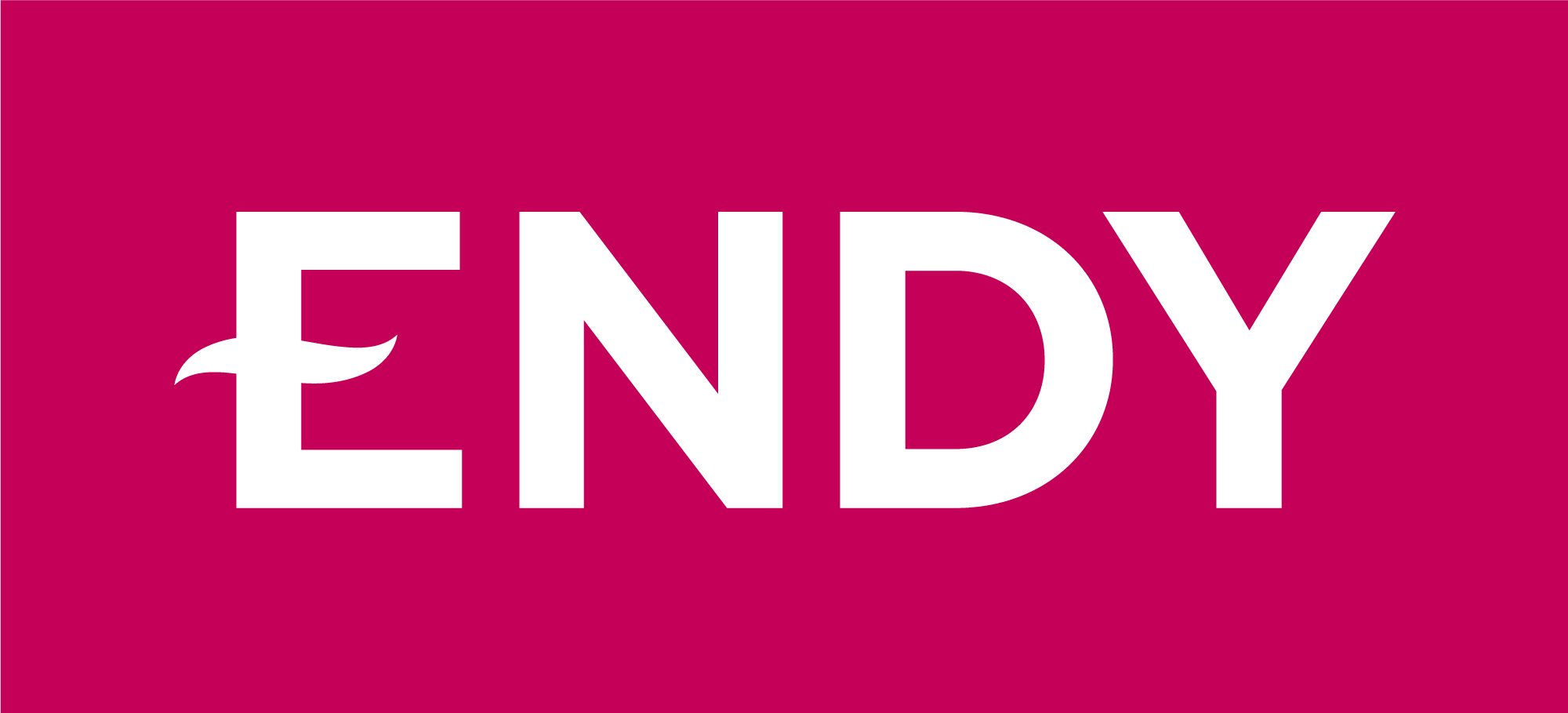
- Type: Subsidiary
- Industry: Mattresses
- Founded: 2015
- Founders: Mike Gettis, Rajen Ruparell
- Area served: Canada
- Products: Mattresses, pillows, bedsheets, and mattress protectors
- Parent: Sleep Country Canada (2018-present)
- Website: endy.com

Endy Sleep (also known as just Endy) is a Canadian-based, e-commerce company that sells sleep products online. Endy primarily operates as an online storefront, with their main headquarters in Toronto. Endy is Canada's largest direct online-only mattress store.

== History ==
Endy was founded in 2015 by CEO Mike Gettis and Chairman Rajen Ruparell (previously of Groupon International). In its start up year, Endy made $1 million in sales, $10 million in 2016, and $20 million in 2017. In June 2016, Endy received the Techweek100 Top Innovators Award.

In 2017, Endy appeared on CBC Dragons' Den. Dragons Michele Romanow, Arlene Dickinson, and Joe Mimran jointly offered a $1 million investment in exchange for 7.5% of the company.

In August 2018, Endy opened a new distribution centre in Langley, British Columbia. The company also operates a distribution centre in Mississauga, Ontario.

In 2018, Dominican baseball player José Bautista, formerly of the Toronto Blue Jays, became an investor for Endy after meeting with Gettis and Ruparell earlier in 2016.

In November 2018, Endy Sleep was acquired by Sleep Country Canada and will continue to operate as an independent subsidiary.

== Awards ==
- Techweek 100 - Innovators Award (2016)
- Toronto TechCrunch Pitchoff - Audience Choice Award (2015)
- Today’s Parent Approved (2018)
- 2018 Startup 50 - 4th overall (2018)
- Great Place To Work® Canada (2019-2021)

== Donation program ==
In the case of returned mattresses, Endy works with local Canadian charities where possible to ensure returned mattresses are donated to those in need.
