= George Anders =

American journalist (born 1957)

- Born: 1957 (age 67–68)
- Education: Stanford University
- Occupation(s): Business journalist, author
- Notable work: Perfect Enough
- Awards: Pulitzer Prize for National Reporting (1997)

George Anders (born 1957) is an American business journalist and the author of five books, including the New York Times bestseller, Perfect Enough. He has worked as an editor or staff writer at The Wall Street Journal, LinkedIn, Fast Company magazine and Bloomberg View. He currently resides in Northern California. Anders's articles and essays have appeared in publications including The New York Times, BusinessWeek, The Atlantic, The Guardian, and the Harvard Business Review.

== Early life and education ==
Anders is a 1978 graduate of Stanford University, with a bachelor's degree in economics. At Stanford, he was elected to the Phi Beta Kappa honor society.

== Career ==
Anders has been writing for national publications since the 1980s. He started his writing career working for The Wall Street Journal and eventually became a top feature writer, specializing in in-depth profiles. A 1996 profile of electronics salesman Jeff Bloom, and his battle to regain his health after being diagnosed with AIDS, became part of a package of Journal articles awarded the Pulitzer Prize for National Reporting. Anders's 1998 article on Healtheon's difficulties developing medical-record software was seen as a major reason why the company soon afterward postponed its much-awaited initial public offering. In The New New Thing, author Michael Lewis wrote that when Healtheon CEO Mike Long read the Journal article he "knew instantly that the roadshow was over."

After his first stint with The Wall Street Journal, Anders served as West Coast bureau chief for Fast Company from 2000 to 2003. Anders rejoined the Journal in 2003 and left in 2008. He later became a founding member of the Bloomberg View board of editors and began working for Forbes as a contributing writer in 2012. In October 2017, he joined LinkedIn's editorial team, where he is a senior editor at large.

== Awards and honors ==
He shared in a Pulitzer Prize for National Reporting in 1997, while at The Wall Street Journal. On May 19, 2018, he was awarded an honorary doctorate by Washington & Jefferson College, where he delivered the 2018 commencement address.

== Bibliography ==
=== Books ===
- Anders, George (May 1992), Merchants of Debt: KKR and the Mortgaging of U.S. Business, Basic Books, ISBN 978-0-465-04522-8
- — (November 1996), Health Against Wealth: HMOs and the Breakdown of Medical Trust, Houghton-Mifflin, ISBN 978-0-395-82283-8
- — (January 2003), Perfect Enough: Carly Fiorina and the Reinvention of Hewlett-Packard, Portfolio, ISBN 978-1-59184-003-9
- — (October 2011), The Rare Find: Spotting Extraordinary Talent Before Anyone Else, Portfolio, ISBN 978-1-59184-425-9
- — (August 2017). You can do anything : the surprising power of a "useless" liberal arts education. Little, Brown. ISBN 978-0-31654-880-9.

=== Critical studies and reviews of Anders' work ===
- Reitter, Paul (February 22, 2018). "The business of learning". The New York Review of Books. 65 (3): 30, 32–33. Review of You can do anything.
