= Good360 =

American charitable organization

- Formation: 1983
- Type: Nonprofit organization
- Headquarters: Alexandria, Virginia
- CEO: Romaine Seguin
- Formerly called: Gifts in Kind International

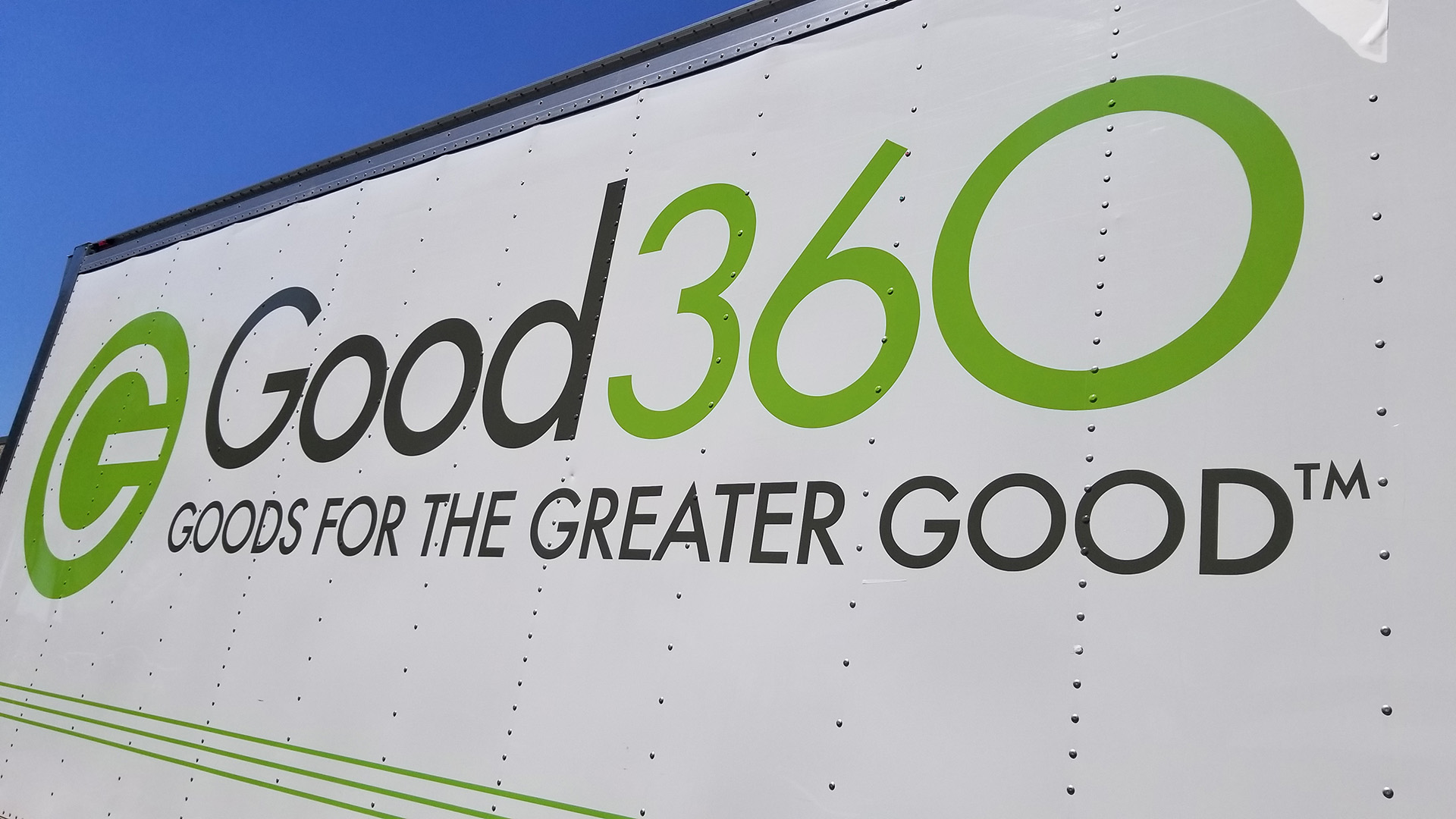

Good360 is a 501(c)(3) charitable organization located in Alexandria, Virginia. In 2021, it was ranked the 6th largest charity in the United States by Forbes magazine.

Good360 has distributed more than $14 billion in donated goods around the world. As a result of the COVID-19 pandemic, Good360 helped distribute over $175 million in donations to its network of nonprofits to help impacted communities across the country.

== Organization ==
The organization, founded in 1983, was originally known as Gifts In Kind International. In 2011 the organization became known as Good360.

Carly Fiorina served as the organization's chair from 2012 until 2015.
