= Gothaer Group =

German insurance company

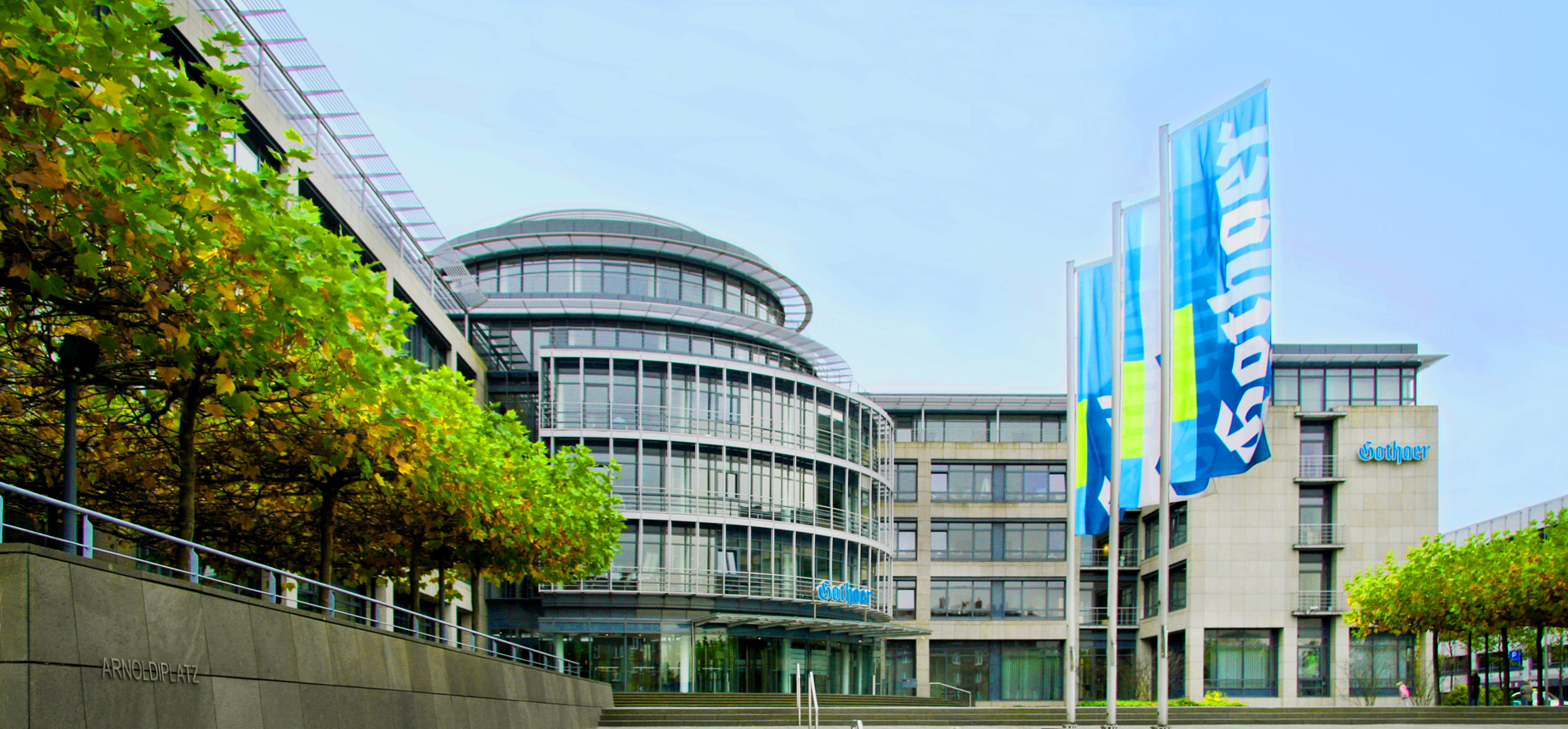
- Gothaer head office in Cologne
- Type: Private
- Industry: Insurance
- Founded: 2 July 1820; 206 years ago
- Headquarters: Cologne, Germany
- Key people: Oliver Schoeller (CEO)
- Revenue: €4.56 billion (2022)
- Number of employees: 5,007 (2022)
- Website: www.gothaer.de

The Gothaer Group (Gothaer Allgemeine Versicherungs AG) is a German insurance company with circa 4.1 million members. Its core businesses are all insurance services. Gothaer Allgemeine Versicherungs AG customers include private clients and small- and medium-sized businesses. They offer their products to private and corporate customers. Their products cover the fields of property, health and life insurance. Gothaer insures industrial, business and private customers, with asset management and investment forming another area of business. Customers are insured for instances like personal or group accidents, motor accidents, property damages, river shipping, robbery and burglary, fire, storms and water damage. The head office is located in Cologne, Germany.

The Gothaer Group reported a net profit of €134 million in 2015. The rate of increase was about 14.5% in comparison to 2014. A part of the profit was taken to strengthen the company's equity. The income level remained nearly the same in 2015, with a peak of 4.5 billion euros.

== History ==
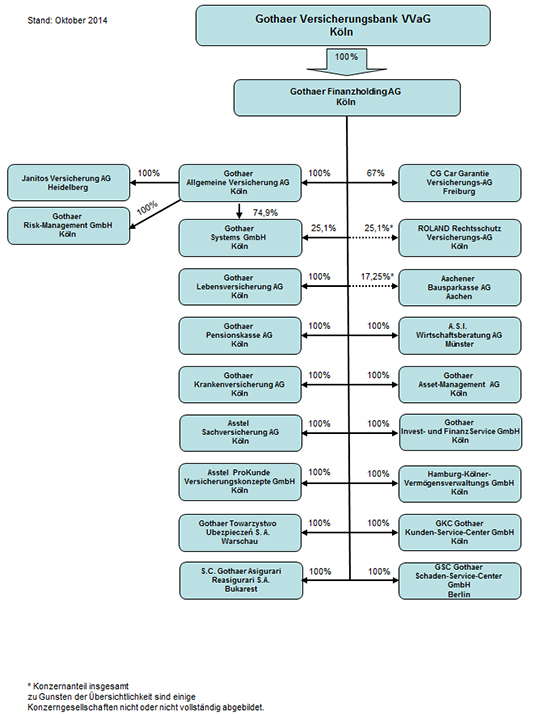
Gothaer organisation chart (2014)

=== Foundation ===
In 1820, Ernst-Wilhelm Arnoldi established the Feuerversicherungsbank des Deutschen Handelsstandes, a company run by merchants, for merchants in the Thuringian town of Gotha. Gothaer was one of Europe's first interregional mutual insurance companies. Soon, after the foundation of the Gothaer Feuerversicherungsbank, other mutual fire insurance companies were founded, such as Versicherungs-Gesellschaft gegen Feuersgefahr and Württembergische Privat-Feuerversicherungs-Gesellschaft.

In 1827 Arnoldi set up a second company, the Gothaer Lebensversicherungsbank für Deutschland. In 1830 the Gothaer Feuerbank was renamed Gothaer Feuerversicherungsbank für Deutschland.

In 1842 the company faced its first serious challenge – the Great Fire of Hamburg and its devastating consequences. It started in Eduard Cohen's cigar factory at Deichstraße 42 or 44 early in the morning of 5 May. The huge fire lasted for four days (until 8 May 1842) and destroyed about a third of the old inner city. A large muster of about 1,150 firefighters and numerous volunteers fought this fire. Below the line, 1749 houses, three churches (St. Nikolai, St. Petri, Gertrudkirche) (Hamburg-Uhlenhorst), two synagogues, 102 attics, the town hall and a couple of other public buildings were destroyed. The Great Fire of Hamburg caused damage of about 90 million marks. One of the biggest historical city museums, the Museum für Hamburger Geschichte, has an exhibition on the Great Fire.

==== Developments in the 19th and 20th century (1900–1996) ====
In 1902, the Gothaer Lebensversicherungsbank für Deutschland was renamed Gothaer Lebensversicherungsbank auf Gegenseitigkeit. In the recent decades, until 1918, the Gothaer Group achieved an insurance portfolio of 1.24 billion marks and assets of almost 500 billion marks. However, as a result of World War I, the company struggled for its existence and independence. The war caused inflation, whereby the company's insurance portfolio and assets were devalued. The Gothaer Group managed to cope with this crisis and was able in the period from 1924 to 1944 to establish their insurance portfolio of 1.25 billion marks.

In 1924, the Gothaer Allgemeine Versicherungs AG was set up. Its main task was to handle the emergent motor insurance business, which included accident insurance, liability insurance, transport insurance and automobile insurance. The Gothaer Allgemeine Versicherungs AG was founded by Karls August Friedrich Samwer, the great-grandfather of the Samwer brothers. In cooperation with David Schneider and Robert Gentz, the three Samwer brothers founded the European e-commerce fashion company Zalando.

From 1945 on, the Gothaer Feuer was no longer permitted to conduct business operations. At that critical juncture Gotha was occupied by the Soviet Union. The company finally moved to Cologne on 5 March 1946. After World War II, a joint working group between Gothaer and Dresdner Feuerversicherung was established. In 1946, the portfolios of Dresdner Feuerversicherung were taken over by Gothaer Feuer until 1950. In 1970, the Gothaer Feuerversicherungsbank auf Gegenseitigkeit was renamed to Gothaer Versicherungsbank VVaG. In 1993, Dr. Bernd Meyer took over the management of Gothaer Risk Management GmbH in Cologne. In 1994, IBM took over the data processing centers of Porsche, Continental AG, Air Liquide and Gothaer Insurance.

==== Developments in the 21st century (1997–present) ====
In 1997, the co-ordination concern Parion was formed, evolved by the Gothaer chief executive Wolfgang Peiner. The brand name Parion was composed of the terms "Parität" and "Union". In 1998, the company Asstel was established as the group's direct insurer. With bonus revenues of 3.9 billion euro in 2000, Parion ranked among to the ten biggest German insurers.

Beginning in 2005, the Gothaer Kunden-Service-Center GmbH (GKC) – with circa 100 employees – was trying to process a large influx of applications. Apart from the Gothaer Group, other insurance companies also outsourced some of their services. Gothaer acquired MLP Versicherung AG and renamed the company Janitos Versicherung AG in 2005, with its head office in Heidelberg. In 2006, Janitos was well-established in the insurance market. In 2006 the Gothaer Lebensversicherung AG moved its head office from Göttingen to Cologne. In 2010, as part of its strategy of expanding into the growth regions of Central and Eastern Europe, the Gothaer Group acquired an interest in Polish non-life insurer Polskie Towarzystwo Ubezpieczeń S.A (PTU), which was previously held by Polish chemicals company Ciech S.A. and its subsidiaries. In 2012, Gothaer entered the Romanian insurance market by acquiring a majority stake in Platinum Asigurari Reasigurari. In the same year, the Platinum Asigurari Reasigurari was renamed Gothaer Asigurari Reasigurari.

In 2013, there was a change at the top of the group. As of 1 January 2014, Dr Werner Görg stepped down as chief executive; the role was taken over by Dr Karsten Eichmann. In 2014 the Asstel Lebensversicherung AG was amalgamated into Gothaer Lebensversicherung AG. In 2015 Gothaer strengthened their equity basis and gained market share in property insurance.

== Group structure ==
=== Germany ===
==== Gothaer Finanzholding AG ====
The Gothaer Finanzholding AG is responsible for the financial controlling of the Gothaer Group. Previously, Parion Finanzholding AG was re-branded to Gothaer Finanzholding AG. The company is located in Cologne, Germany. In 2004, the reinsurer Gothaer Rück finally joined up with the Gothaer Finanzholding AG.

==== Gothaer Lebensversicherung AG ====
The Gothaer Lebensversicherung AG offers services in the areas of insurance, pension and asset management. As a German insurance company it provides products which focus on term life, funeral aspects, disease, etc. They have around 540 employees.

==== Gothaer Krankenversicherung AG ====
The Gothaer Krankenversicherung AG is a part of the Gothaer Finanzholding AG. In 2013 the company had nearly 6.000 employees. Their services include ambulant or stationary health insurance, sick pay insurance, group insurance, and nursing care insurance The gross dues of the Gothaer Krankenversicherung were estimated at 875 million euros by Michael Kurtenbach (chairman) in 2014. In the same year, the number of customers who had supplementary insurance had increased to 422 thousand. In a ranking study of the Institut für Vorsorge und Finanzplanung GmbH (IVFP), the Gothaer Pflegetagegeld-Versicherung (of the Gothaer Krankenversicherung AG) was honored due to its high flexibility, with an overall mark of 1.9.

From September 2015, the Gothaer Krankenversicherung AG has offered their clients a special service - customers may submit their bills, simply and without any paperwork, via the Gothaer app. The transmission takes place either by scanning the QR code printed on the bill, or via the app's photo function.

==== Asstel ====
On behalf of n-tv, the Deutsches Institut für Service-Qualität analyzed 31 automobile insurances in total. As one of the top two products, according to the cost-benefit ratio, approved the Komfort-Tarif of the direct insurer Asstel. In the end Asstel achieved the second rank in the overall results. In 2014, the Gothaer Group amalgamated Asstel and Gothar. Clients can earn bonus miles from Miles & More, if they effect a new insurance.

==== Janitos Versicherung AG ====
Previously MLP Versicherung AG (founded in 2000) has been alienated to the Gothaer Group and re-branded to Janitos Versicherung AG in 2015. For its customers it remained an insurance for target-group-specific finance businesses. Its head office is located in Heidelberg, Germany. In 2013, Wolfgang Bach joined the executive board, to which Peter Schneider, Klaus-Christoph Reichert and Stephan Oetzel already belonged.

=== Austria ===
In 1982 the Gothaer Lebensversicherung AG was set up in Austria. Currently the Austrian establishment concentrates on the coverage of biometric risks. On 1 July 2016, Helmut Karner (56 years old) took over the leadership of distribution.

=== Poland ===
Founded in 1990, Polskie Towarzystwo Ubezpieczen S.A. was acquired by Gothaer in stages, with Gothaer holding a 45% stake in 2010 and increasing it to 100% in 2011. Gothaer sold its Polish subsidiary Gothaer Towarzystwo Ubezpieczen S.A. to Vienna Insurance Group on 1 March 2019.

=== Romania ===
Established in 2006, CLAL Romania Asigurari-Resigurari SA was acquired by Gothaer in February 2012. Subsequently, the company changed the name to Gothaer in January 2013. Gothaer's Romanian subsidiary, Gothaer Asigurari Reasigurari, was sold to Allianz on March 25, 2022, and rebranded as Allianz Tiriac Unit.

== External agency ratings ==
Gothaer is appraised annually by independent rating agencies such as Fitch and Standard & Poor's. In September 2015 Fitch Ratings affirmed both the Gothaer Allgemeine Versicherung and the Gothaer Lebensversicherung at 'A'.

== Sustainability as a business field of the future ==
Gothaer insures wind power plants all over the world over and has become a market leader in this sector. In 2014, the Gothaer Insurance Group became an important strategic partner of the Juwi subsidiary IPP GmbH & Co. KG. The company planned to invest up to €150 million in the expansion of Juwi IPP's power plant park. In 2015, Gothaer loaned €150 million to the company Capital Stage and was able to gain a fourfold return out of that project.

Capital Stage operates with wind and solar assets. One current and huge offshore wind project has been invested in by the Gothaer Group. This MW Nordergruende project will take place in the German North Sea, developed by Wpd AG.
