= Philips Consumer Communications =

Global Consumer Communication Company

Philips Consumer Communications (PCC)
- Type: Joint venture
- Industry: Electronics
- Founded: October 7, 1997; 28 years ago
- Founders: Lucent Technologies and Royal Philips Electronics
- Defunct: 1998
- Fate: Closed down and assets split between joint venture partners
- Headquarters: Parsippany, New Jersey, United States
- Area served: Worldwide
- Products: Cellular phones, corded phones, answering machines, and pagers.
- Owner: Lucent Technologies (40%) and Royal Philips Electronics (60%)

Philips Consumer Communications (abbreviated to PCC) was a $2.5 billion joint venture of Lucent Technologies and Royal Philips Electronics formed in 1997 and closed in 1999.

Philips owned 60% of the joint venture, with Lucent owning the other 40%. PCC was a global venture, with branches in more than 100 countries, including the US, Latin America, Asia-Pacific and Europe.

== History ==
The joint venture was formed on October 7, 1997 in Parsippany, New Jersey by Lucent Technologies and Philips to create mobile and landline phones. The company consisted of the consumer communications equipment businesses of both companies. Both companies made products in the venture, often not sold under their own names. Philips Consumer Communications produced the following equipment:

- digital/analog cellular phones – sold under Philips brand
- corded/cordless phones – sold under AT&T brand
- answering machines – sold under AT&T brand
- screen phones – sold under Philips brand
- pagers/cellular telephones – sold under both Lucent/Philips brands

Eventually, all telecommunications products made in the venture would have been sold under the Philips brand.

In 1998, Lucent and Philips announced it would dissolve its joint venture, after garnering only a 2% market share in mobile phones and losing $500 million on a revenue of $2.5 billion. Both companies initially re-absorbed their respective assets in the joint venture, but Lucent subsequently sold off its parts to VTech and Motorola.
