= Gifts in kind =

Charitable donation of goods and services

Gifts in kind, also referred to as in-kind donations, is a kind of charitable giving in which, instead of giving money to buy needed goods and services, the goods and services themselves are given. Gifts in kind are distinguished from gifts of cash or not measured in monetary terms. Some types of gifts in kind are appropriate, but others are not. Examples of in-kind gifts include goods like food, clothing, medicines, furniture, office equipment, and building materials. Performance of services, providing office space or offering administrative support, may also be counted as in-kind gifts.

While many attest to the benefits of in-kind over cash gifts, others have argued for their disadvantages, particularly in the context of disaster relief.

== Arguments in favor of gifts in kind ==
=== Reduce in waste of materials ===
Many donated goods are either second hand or otherwise surplus. If not donated to people who need them, they might otherwise end up in a landfill. Thus, it is argued that gifts in kind reduce resource use and pollution. This provides a means, particularly for corporations, of doing social good with things that would otherwise be a liability.

=== Use in disaster relief ===
During disasters and other humanitarian crises, companies and individuals often want to help with the disaster relief operations. Some people have argued that giving goods that are already at hand is more cost effective for the donor than giving money to buy these same goods, thus reducing the cost of buying the goods afresh, particularly in the face of shortages.

=== Long-term development aid ===
Helping with longer term development in impoverished or otherwise distressed areas is a high priority for governments and large NGOs. It is argued that gifts in kind can be a significant component of a larger humanitarian development strategy.

=== Lower susceptibility to corruption ===
It has been argued that donated goods are much less susceptible to becoming graft because physical goods are more tangible than money.

However, the argument may be reversed in the modern context, now that there exist mobile phone-based payment mechanisms such as m-Pesa that have been used successfully for cash transfer programs, making cash transfers less dependent on intermediaries than the shipping of physical goods.

=== Great impact for small cost ===
Gifts in kind supply a market efficiency that is difficult to attain by other means. For example, many charities that provide life-saving medications to people in impoverished nations could not afford to buy these drugs using their cash donations or grants alone. Donated drugs help these organizations to work most effectively at a much lower cost.

=== Access to goods which are not readily available ===
Some products are simply not available but are still desperately needed. An example is anti-malarial drugs, which are unavailable in many areas of the world where they are most needed, and if they are available, the people who need them are not in a position to purchase them. They are not manufactured locally and the costs of setting up local manufacturing facilities would be prohibitive, given the regulations surrounding pharmaceuticals. There is a high likelihood of locally available drugs being counterfeit, with often fatal consequences.

=== Corporate social responsibility ===
As more and more companies continue to acknowledge their corporate social responsibility, they are also recognizing the benefits of participating in gifts in kind programs. In The Business Case for Product Philanthropy, a 63-page report published by the Indiana University School of Public and Environmental Affairs, authors Justin M. Ross and Kellie L. McGiverin-Bohan argue that businesses can do well by doing good through product philanthropy, as well as explore the advantages of donating goods over the liquidation and/or destruction of goods. In addition, with cash donations on the decrease over the past several years, offering donations of goods and services is a way for corporations to continue pursuing their philanthropic goals.

== Arguments against gifts in kind ==
=== Matching of donation to recipient needs ===
One of the chief criticisms of gifts in kind, particularly in the context of disaster relief but also in other contexts, is that the things that people are likely to gift may be poorly matched to the immediate needs of recipients, but rather be influenced by what donors happen to want to dispose of. Some of the possibilities are:

- The donated items may not be needed by the recipients at all.
- The donated items may be needed by the recipients but are available locally and the cost of shipping the items from a remote location is far more than the cost of obtaining them locally. In the context of disaster relief, a large influx of donated goods may clog the ports making it difficult for needed emergency supplies to reach their recipients.
- The donated items may be needed somewhat by the recipients, but it may be more beneficial if the items were sold to the highest payer and the money thus collected be used to meet other needs of the intended recipients.

=== Empowerment of recipients ===
In addition to the argument that gifts in kind often do not meet the needs of recipients, it has also been argued that gifts in kind fail to empower the recipients because the recipients don't have as much flexibility on how to spend the gifts as they would with gifts of cash or of public goods that they actively solicit. Relatedly, it has been argued that sending gifts in kind without checking on what the recipients may actually need may be disrespectful to the recipients, and in some cases self-centered and narcissistic, being focused on the needs of the donor rather than the recipient.

=== Impact on local economies ===
Some critics of gifts in kind argue that, like dumping, these have an artificial adverse impact on local industries producing similar goods.

== Response to criticism ==
=== Improved communication between recipients and donors ===
Some of the downsides of gifts in kind may be mitigated by allowing recipients to communicate their needs to donors, thus helping donors and recipients match up. This has been made possible with the advent of the Internet as it is now possible to create an online marketplace for in-kind donations. Gifts in Kind International operates a network called Good360 that aims to do exactly this. Occupy Sandy volunteers use a sort of gift registry for this purpose; families and businesses impacted by the storm make specific requests, which remote donors can purchase directly via a web site.

The majority of online giving marketplaces, including GlobalGiving and DonorsChoose, however, are focused on cash donations, though the nonprofits seeking these donations usually specify what types of things they intend to buy with a given donation quantity.

=== Standards for gifts in kind ===
Global Hand has published a series of standards for gifts in kind. The principles include:

- Need driven: Driven by a genuine and thorough understanding of the needs of the recipients.
- Quality controlled: Goods are carefully chosen, of appropriate quality, and in consultation with the recipient.
- Determined by informed choices.
- Avoiding aid dependency.

and many more.

The Tales from the Hood blog has argued that there are two preconditions for successful gifts in kind.:

- Gifts in kind should not drive the design of the charity program or aid program. Rather, the program should be evaluated based on the evidence and the appropriate gifts should be determined based on that evidence.
- Gifts in kind should not be used to substitute for other needed items if they do not fit the requirements well.

== Charity stores ==
Unlike a disaster relief scenario, the needs of a charity shop are long-term and more flexible; any item that can be sold at a price higher than the cost of warehousing it could be worthwhile. Large non-profits, such as Goodwill Industries, are also able to make use of items that cannot be sold in their thrift stores, for example by bundling them and selling them as bulk material or scrap. These stores refuse donations that cost money to dispose of safely if unwanted, such as e-waste.

== See also ==
- Corporate social responsibility
- Gifts In Kind International
- Cash transfer

== Literature ==
- Janet Currie and Firouz Gahvari: Transfers in Cash and In-Kind: Theory Meets the Data, Journal of Economic Literature, 2008, 46(2): 333-383.
