= Sleep Country Canada =

Canadian mattress retailer

Sleep Country Canada Inc.
- Type: Subsidiary
- Industry: Retail
- Founded: 1994; 32 years ago (Vancouver, British Columbia, Canada)
- Founders: Christine Magee; Stephen K. Gunn; Gordon Lownds
- Headquarters: Toronto, Ontario, Canada
- Number of locations: 264 stores 16 distribution centres
- Area served: Canada
- Key people: Stephen K. Gunn, Christine Magee, David Friesma
- Products: Mattresses, Bed frames, Headboards, Bed linens, Pillows
- Number of employees: 1,200
- Parent: Fairfax Financial
- Subsidiaries: Endy Sleep; Hush
- Website: www.sleepcountry.ca

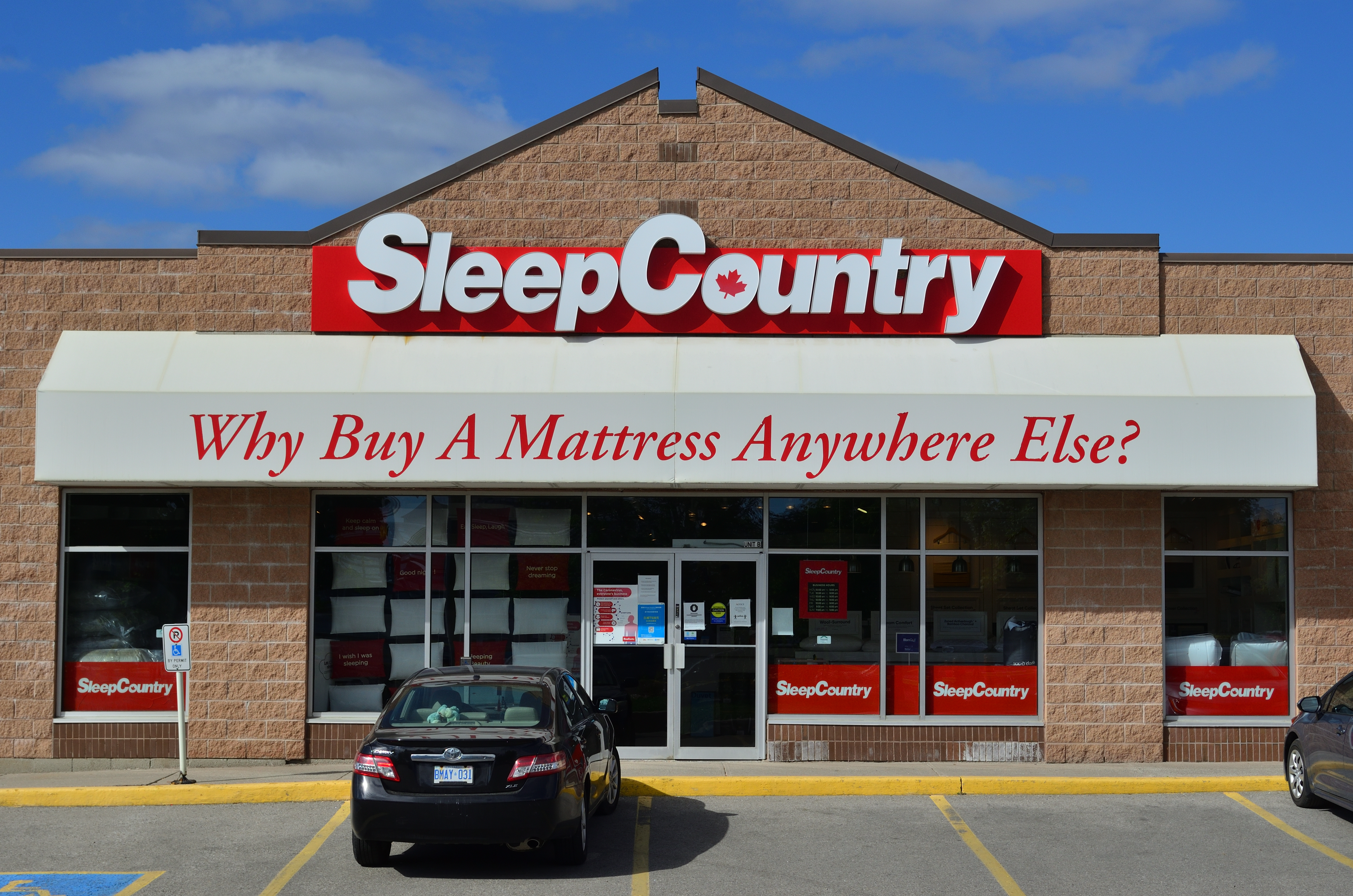
Sleep Country in Richmond Hill, ON

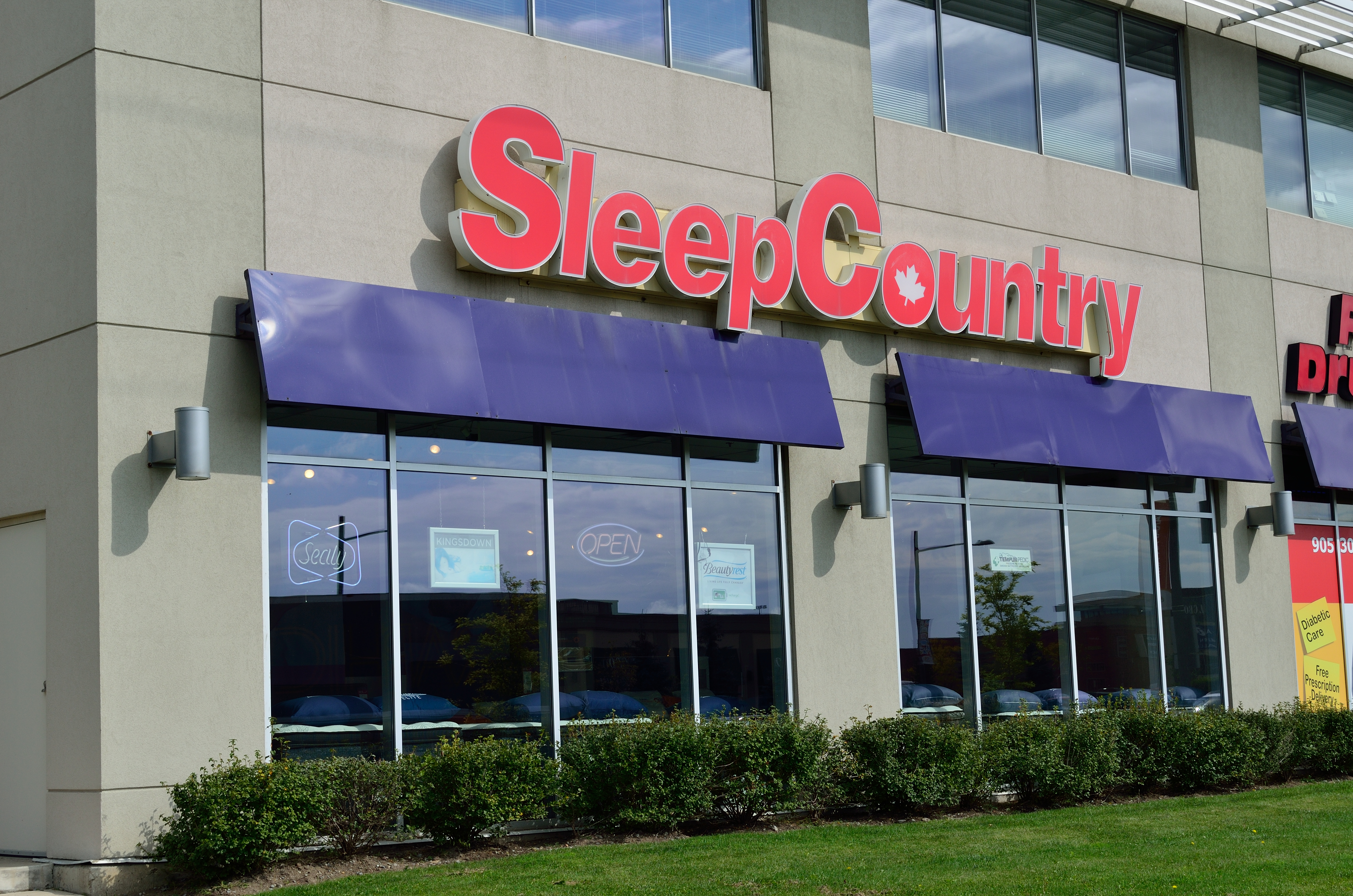
A Sleep Country store in Markham, Ontario

Sleep Country Canada Inc. is a Canadian mattress retailer and #1 specialty retailer of Canada with over 250 stores operating in British Columbia, Alberta, Saskatchewan, Manitoba, Ontario, Quebec, New Brunswick, Prince Edward Island and Nova Scotia. In 2006, the company was ranked one of the top 50 companies to work for in Canada by the Globe and Mail.

It is best known for its radio jingle, "Why buy a mattress anywhere else?" Sleep Country USA (now called Mattress Firm), an unaffiliated company, used the same jingle.

== History ==
In 1994, the three partners Christine Magee, Stephen K. Gunn and Gordon Lownds launched the first four Sleep Country locations in Vancouver. By 1996, the chain had expanded to Toronto with 19 new stores. Growth continued at quick rate. By 2001, the company had 72 stores in six regional markets and an estimated 40% of the market in regions where it operated. In 2003, Sleep Country converted into an income trust, and raised nearly CA$130 million in an initial public offering.

In January 2006 the company purchased Dormez-vous Sleep Centres Inc. with five stores in Montreal, which continues to operate as a separate company. In March 2006 it added 32 stores in the US through an acquisition of Sleep America Inc., a mattress retailer in Arizona.

On August 14, 2008, The Canadian Press reported that two Toronto-based investment firms, Birch Hill Equity Partners Management Inc. and Westerkirk Capital Inc., made a friendly takeover offer worth $356 million (CAD) for all the units of the Sleep Country Canada Income Fund, the parent company of Sleep Country Canada. This offer was accepted.

In 2015, the company went public again, in an IPO on the Toronto Stock Exchange raising $300 million. Its new ticker symbol was "ZZZ".

Between 2018 and 2023, Sleep Country acquired various competitor bed-in-a-box brands, such as Endy, Casper Sleep's Canadian operations, Silk & Snow, and Hush.

On October 2, 2024, Sleep Country was acquired by Fairfax Financial for $1.7B CAD.

In summer 2025, Sleep Country Canada purchased the Canadian and U.K. rights to the Bed Bath & Beyond name and logos and the domain names for several websites. It will relaunch the retailer in 2026 with physical stores and online.
