= Opportunity management =

Opportunity management (OM) has been defined as "a process to identify business and community development opportunities that could be implemented to sustain or improve the local economy".

Opportunity management is a collaborative approach for economic and business development. The process focuses on tangible outcomes. Opportunity management may result in interesting and motivating projects that help improve teamwork. Its three components are

1. generating ideas,
2. recognizing opportunities, and
3. driving opportunities.

== Risk ==
Risk management can be described as the process of proactively working with stakeholders to minimise the risks and maximise the opportunity associated with project decisions. Risks are about the possibility of an adverse consequence. Good risk management does not have to be expensive or time consuming but relies on adaptability in response to change. Risk management ensures that an organization identifies and understands the risks to which it is exposed. Organisations continuously face environments in which uncertainty is constantly challenging the existing ways of doing business and the way that risk needs to be managed. However, the upside to risk, that is often overlooked, is that the feared uncertain event could have a desired outcome. TAP University's blog notes that this is a positive risk or opportunity and needs to be managed to ensure a good result. Having a clear understanding of all risks allows an organization to measure and prioritize them and take the appropriate actions to reduce losses.

Where risk management seeks to understand what might go badly in a project, opportunity management looks for what might go better.

Opportunity management is the process that converts the chance to decisiveness and is increasingly becoming embedded in the culture of organisations as they mature and broaden their understanding of the value that managing uncertainty can bring. For positive risk or opportunity management to be effective in creating or protecting value it must be an integral part of the management processes, be embedded in the culture and practices of the organisation, be tailored to the business process of the organisation, and comply with the risk management principles outlined in ISO 31000. An opportunity management process has required elements that need to be evaluated before advancing and allocating scarce resources to any project. All organisations have limited resources and it is important that they are used sensibly.

The first step that an organisation should take in order to improve decision making and reduce risk is identifying potential opportunities. It is advised that a business takes the necessary time and considers numerous ways of identifying opportunities for initiatives. Organisations could implement processes like "organizational catch ball" which would help them to develop plans and strategies for economic growth in the community. As Conti notes, "the interactive catch ball process from management level to the next is necessary for correct planning and alignment of goals". They could also implement brainstorming activities, hold stakeholder meetings, hold focus group interviews and hold jurisdictional reviews. This would help the organisation generate ideas to include in the initiative funnel. The firm should proceed to evaluate and prioritize initiatives to enable more effective courses of action to be taken in the future. This would involve ranking criteria in order of importance to ensure the correct alignment of targets for the projects. It is vital that the firm includes many opportunities in the decision making funnel to be effective. This will allow for a more comprehensive scope of ideas to be included in the decision making funnel.

== Funnel ==
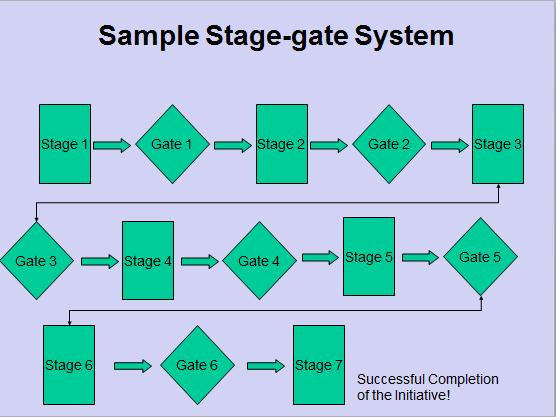
Sample stage-gate decision making system. The number of stages and gates will vary depending on the initiative

An opportunity management funnel is a framework that allows management to evaluate and select opportunities. An opportunity management funnel is a process whereby many opportunities are put in up front and fewer investment decisions coming out at the end of the funnel. The goal of the opportunity management funnel is to eliminate weak ideas before they consume excessive resources while allowing strong ideas to filter through the process. The challenges for the business and project management team is to make choices and decisions that move toward the desired objectives – a task that is made difficult by change.

The funnel approach raises questions pertaining to:

- Who will work to move the idea forward?
- What assessment criteria should be set?
- Who will decide whether the idea should be pursued or dropped?
- How will the decision be made?

The funnel filters the broadest range of opportunities and ensures that all priority sectors are represented. The process must be unbiased and lead to a choice of resources that maximizes return. When selecting which opportunities to filter through the process, users should be aware that initially, there are no bad ideas or limits. The unviable alternatives will be filtered out using the phase–gate model. Rigorous screening must be applied to focus on the initiative. The business can examine the merit of each initiative before deciding to dedicate resources to the project. The business will have the option to implement three decisions at a gate such as advance, rework and kill the project. Perhaps the greatest challenge that users of stage and gate processes face is making the gates work well: as go the gate, so goes the process. This will help prevent the firm from wasting valuable resources and time on ineffective initiatives.

=== Stage-gate/phase–gate decision making ===
The stage-gate process was created because the traditional organisational structure is primarily for top-down, centralized control and communications, all of which are not practical for organizations that use project management and horizontal workflow. The stage-gate process evolved into life-cycle phases. Stages are phases of the decision-making process where development work is completed. Phase–gate systems divide the innovation process into a predetermined set of stages composed of a group of "prescribed, related, and often parallel activities." Most Phase–gate systems involve four to seven stages. Since each proceeding stage is more expensive than the previous, it is imperative that a high degree of research-backed discrimination is involved in passing stages. The body of research collected for proposed initiatives should be frequently consulted to adequately support the decision-making processes.

A firm could use certain assessment criteria to help identify opportunities and will ensure resources are not wasted on low value opportunities. There are three types of criteria that a firm could use. These include criteria of inclusion, criteria of exclusion and portfolio level criteria. Using assessment criteria would provide a transparent process that will highlight what initiatives to abandon and which initiatives to pursue. Exclusion criteria could be used by the firm, as it saves time and money. It is a simple method of reducing the number of initiatives to evaluate. "A firm must maintain records to support why a portfolio was assigned to a specific composite, or was excluded from all composites." The firm could also look at inclusive criteria to help to prioritize initiatives. This could include ensuring that it has key stakeholder support, or making the initiative economically feasible. Portfolio level criteria may also be used to ensure the right mixes of initiatives are used. Ensuring that the initiatives stimulate job creation and have the support of the community are some of the criteria that the firm could include while planning an initiative.

It is imperative that evaluation of each gate should be objective, open-minded, clear on the businesses' strategic goals and done by experienced people. People that are evaluating the project at each gate must have the courage to terminate the project if necessary. This is important as it will prevent any bias from occurring throughout the decision making phase. However, the system that the firm puts in place should not be so rigorous that it omits viable projects or too laid-back that resources are spread finely across multiple projects. "The lack of tough Go/Kill decision points means too many product failures, resources wasted on the wrong projects, and a lack of focus." A level of uncertainty can be positive for evaluating criteria by the firm as too many kills of ideas may discourage stakeholders from forming ideas.

== Philosophical underpinnings ==
A risk and opportunity management policy is a statement of intent which should communicate an organisations attitude, rational and philosophy towards risk and opportunity management. While opportunity management is considered to be a recent phenomenon resulting from the blending different project management methodologies, business development is well-rooted in philosophy.

Aristotle's Nicomachean Ethics clearly differentiates between the outcomes (ends) we aim to achieve and the outputs (means) we use to achieve these outcomes. Careful deliberation is required to select the outputs that are most likely to contribute to the outcomes we desire. Aristotle understands that problems could arise that would necessitate dropping one output in favor of another. Aristotle's theory links the logic-model to the Phase–gate process thereby introducing deliberation and kill points. Aristotle states:

"Rather, we lay down the end, and then examine the ways to and means to achieve it. If it appears that any of several [possible] means will reach it, we examine which of them will reach it most easily and most finely; and if only one [possible] means reaches it, we examine how that means will reach it and how the means itself is reached, until we come to the first cause, the last thing to be discovered. For a deliberator would seem to inquire and analyze in the way described, as though analyzing a diagram...If we encounter an impossible step – for instance, we need money but cannot raise it – we desist; but if it appears possible we undertake it. What is possible is what we achieve through our agency [including what our friend could achieve for us]... Deliberation is about the actions he can do, and actions are for the sake of other things; hence we deliberate about things that promote an end, not about the end."

Kant's Critique of Judgment is probably the most important and influential work in Western aesthetic theory. Philosopher Immanuel Kant's aesthetic theory also offers insight into opportunity management as it makes the connection between the imaginative (open end of the funnel) and understanding (application of deliberative thought and criteria). Kant states:

"For, in lawless freedom, imagination, with all its wealth, produces nothing but nonsense; the power of judgement, on the other hand, is the faculty that makes it consonant with understanding. Taste, like judgement in general, is the discipline (or corrective) of genius. ... It introduces a clearness and order into the plenitude of thought, and in so doing, gives stability to the ideas, and qualifies them at once for permanent and universal approval."

There are endless things that can be considered, but only a small portion of these can practically be achieved. If opportunity management does not adequately address both imagination and understanding, the best opportunities will not be pursued. Some individuals and organisations have become so used to thinking of risk management solely in terms of the negative outcomes of uncertainty that they recoil from using the same process to address opportunities. Opportunity management requires originality and rule: Kant notes:

"...genius (1) is a talent for producing that for which no definite rule can be given, and not an aptitude in a way of cleverness for what can be learned according to some rule; and that consequently originality must be its primary property. (2) Since there may be original nonsense, its products must at the same time be models, i.e., be exemplary; and consequently, though not themselves derived from imitation, they must serve that purpose for others, i.e., as a standard or rule of estimating. (3) It cannot indicate scientifically how it brings about its product, but rather gives the rule as nature. Hence, where an author owes a product to his genius, he does not himself know how the ideas for it have entered into his head, nor has he the power to invent like at pleasure, or methodologically, and communicate the same to others in such precepts as would put them in a position to produce similar products... (4) Nature prescribes the rule through genius not to science but to art, and this also only in so far as it is to be fine art."

American philosopher Charles S. Peirce notes that new knowledge originates outside of the traditional logic of induction and deduction. He posits a process of abduction through which a mind freed from constraints to arrive at a creative inference. Abduction is a process of conjecture that is capable of creating new knowledge through the positing of a novel hypothesis. It makes no claim to 'what is' but rather to 'what might be.' The content of the idea cannot be tested in advance but where the process of reaching a decision is biased the idea is likely to be flawed. Peirce notes, "But observed facts relate exclusively to the particular circumstances that happen to exist when they were observed. They do not relate to any future occasions upon which we may be in doubt how we ought to act. They, therefore, do not, in themselves contain practical knowledge." Opportunity management entails ongoing assessment of the decision-making process increasing the likelihood of success.

Roger Martin asserts that Pierce's notion of abduction is the basis of what he terms "Design Thinking" which is at the core of "the most powerful formula for competitive advantage in the twenty-first century." Design thinking is about the creation of, as well as the adaptive use of a body-of behaviors and values. Design thinking embeds integrative thinking throughout the entire organization. In his book "The Opposable Mind", Martin states:

"At its core, integrative thinking requires the integration of mastery and originality. Without mastery there won't be a useful salience, causality, or architecture. Without originality, there will be no creative resolution. Without creative resolution, there will be no enhancement of mastery, and when mastery stagnates, so does originality. Mastery is an enabling condition for originality, which in turn, is a generative condition for mastery. The modes are interdependent."

== In project management ==
Project management is the planning, organizing and controlling of a firm's resources to achieve reasonably short-term goals that have been established to complete specific targets and objectives. It is usually management driven and focuses on setting targets, problem solving and obtaining results. The purpose of project management is to act as a change agent, delivering a change to the status quo of a project, and achieving this in a controlled and managed way. In the initiation stage of project management, opportunity management may aid in the determination of the nature and scope of the project. Much like the initiation stage of project management, opportunity management aids in determining the nature and scope of projects. Since the initiation stage is crucial to the overall performance of the project management cycle, opportunity management may be used by project managers to determine which projects are worth pursuing. Project management is an attempt to manage uncertainty, since it is seen as a structured approach to produce managed change in a changing environment.

=== History of opportunities in project management ===
Risk management appears in scientific and management literature since the 1920s. It became a formal science in the 1950s, when articles and books with "risk management" in the title also appear in library searches. Most of research was initially related to finance and insurance.

Opportunities first appear in academic research or management books in the 1990's. The first PMBoK Project Management Body of Knowledge draft of 1987 doesn't mention opportunities at all.

Modern project management school does recognize the importance of opportunities. Opportunities have been included in project management literature since the 1990s, e.g. in PMBoK, and became a significant part of project risk management in the years 2000s, when articles titled "opportunity management" also begin to appear in library searches.

Modern risk management theory deals with any type of external events, positive and negative. Positive risks are called opportunities. Similarly to risks, opportunities have specific mitigation strategies: exploit, share, enhance, ignore.

In practice, risks are considered "usually negative". Risk-related research and practice focus significantly more on threats than on opportunities. This can lead to negative phenomena such as target fixation

=== Opportunities in project management ===
Opportunity management may aid in defining the business needs/requirements of the organization through the filtration of various alternatives and budgeting requirements. In the process of planning, projects should be properly defined and divided into logical, progressive steps. The screening and assessment criteria offered by opportunity management allow project managers to establish the business case for the project. Opportunity management determines which projects are worth pursuing before dedicating excessive resources. As the project progresses from the initiation stage to the planning and design phase, the screening and assessment criteria will act as a continuous gauge to determine the viability of the project. This ongoing determination of the viability of the project also aids in portfolio management since project managers employ opportunity management to determine which projects are worth pursuing and the prioritization of projects. Furthermore, project managers should be able to identify and engage the appropriate stakeholders throughout the entire project life cycle and determine who must be involved in each phase and who merely needs to be kept informed of the progress made.

Opportunity management determines the payback of the project within the initiation stage. Although the payback period is defined by Kerzner as the least precise of all capital budgeting methods because the calculations are in dollars and cannot adjusted for the time value of money. By establishing the payback period within the opportunity management process, project managers may continually assess the project expenditures and re-evaluate the payback period on an ongoing basis.

Project management is the planning, delegating, monitoring and controlling of all aspects of the project, and the motivation of those involved, to achieve the project objectives within the expected performance targets for time, cost, quality, scope benefits and risks. The monitoring and control phase of project management mirrors fairly closely stage gate decision making, although stage gate decision making addresses potential problems earlier in the project management cycle. Like the monitoring and control phase, the logic model employed in opportunity management observes and monitors the project performance on an ongoing basis. The logic model helps a firm to outline the sequence of events related to the project. In a nutshell, a logic model is a valuable tool that produces a basic program "picture" that shows how the organisation's program is intended to do work. If the project is determined to be unable to meet the criteria outlined in the opportunity management process, the project or opportunity managers will take measures to correct the problems and put the project back on track.

=== Positive complexity ===
Opportunities in project management are aligned with the theory of positive project complexity proposed by Stefan Morcov, and to the antifragility concept proposed by Nicolas Taleb.

Positive complexity generates project opportunities.

== Community capacity building ==
Capacity building is designed to promote change. Capacity building may be defined as anything that increases the ability and/or desire of groups, businesses, municipalities, not-for-profit organizations to effectively engage in community economic development. Stakeholders such as Governments can contribute to environmental community capacity building not only through the provision of practical support in terms of resource provision and throughout the opening up of information and communication channels for communities, but also ensuring that there is meaningful collaboration with communities.

Capacity building is an approach to economic development that focuses on understanding the difficulties that prevent people, governments, organizations form recognizing their developmental goals while enhancing the abilities that will allow them to achieve measurable and sustainable results. It involves training and development activities that get the community actively involved in the development of their locality. Put simply, capacity building is any initiative that increases the desire or ability of individuals, groups and organisations to effectively participate in economic development activities. Community capacity building assists groups by enhancing skills essential to regional economic planning, development and implementation. Capacity building cannot be seen or undertaken in isolation as it is deeply embedded in the social, economic and political environment. It is about strengthening peoples capacity to determine their own values and priorities and to act on these, which gives us the basis of development. In examining community capacity building and local economic development, it is essential to recognise the importance of building links between social economy organisations and the private sector as well as governments in order to address the complex social and economic problems which all communities confront.

Along with "empowerment, "participation", and "gender equality", capacity building is seen as an essential element if development is to be sustainable and centered in people. Developing opportunity management systems is an important part of opportunity management since the model since it allows organizations to identify the most effective allocation of resources. Since communities have fixed resources, opportunity management is a useful tool to identify the most utilitarian allocation of resources to achieve the maximum benefit. The essential criteria for all initiatives should be included and must not be wasted as all organisations face limited resources. Community capacity building has the potential to reach into social and economic life and contribute to building stronger, more cohesive and resilient communities.
