= The Opposable Mind =

2007 book by Roger Martin

- Author: Roger Martin
- Language: English
- Genre: Business
- Publisher: Harvard Business Review Press
- Publication date: 2007
- Publication place: United States

The Opposable Mind: How Successful Leaders Win Through Integrative Thinking is a book written by Roger Martin and published by the Harvard Business Review Press in 2007. The book aims to introduce a concept of integrative thinking, using academic theory and insights from prominent business leaders to substantiate the idea.

== Summary ==
Martin argues that to emulate the world’s best leaders, people need to study how leaders think. He argues that integrative thinking is a standard feature found in successful leaders. The book gives a working definition of integrative thinking as: “The ability to face the tension of opposing ideas constructively and, instead of choosing one at the expense of the other, generate a creative resolution of the tension in the form of a new idea that contains elements of the opposing ideas but is superior to each.”

Martin notes some of the major differences between integrative thinkers and conventional thinkers. Integrative thinkers: take a broad view of what is salient despite the increase it causes in the complexity of problems, consider multi-directional and non-linear causal relationships, keep the entire problem in mind while working on individual segments, and search for creative resolutions rather than accept tradeoffs.

In the second half of the book, Martin outlines how to develop integrative thinking capabilities. The three main components that make up the integrative thinkers' personal knowledge system are stance, tools and experience: “the tripod supporting the system”. Martin devotes a chapter to each element of the tripod, explaining their significance in the integrative thinker’s development and how they combine to create an effective integrative thinker.

Throughout the book, Martin studies the thought processes of prominent leaders, and for each chapter uses several examples outlining how the leader of interest used a particular aspect of integrative thinking to create a successful strategy.

== Leaders used in Book ==
- Isadore Sharp, founder of Four Seasons Hotels
- A.G. Lafley CEO of Procter & Gamble
- Bob Young, co-founder of Red Hat software
- Piers Handling, director of Toronto International Film Festival
- Moses Znaimer co-founder Citytv
- Victoria Hale, founder of The Institute for OneWorld Health (IOWH)
- Taddy Blecher, co-founder of CIDA City Campus

== Reaction ==
The book has been noted for having a thesis that understands "that fresh thought processes are required to deal with the world's contradictions and complexities" and has been praised for showing how great leaders think rather than what they do. India’s Business Today argues that the book will “almost certainly enable you to go beyond the sort of reasoning taught at most B-schools.”

The main criticism of the book has been its inability "to teach "generative reasoning" or to provide readers with specific conceptual tools and a knowledge system for integrative thinking."

Integrative thinking is taught in MBA programs at several business schools, most notably the Rotman School.

== See also ==
- The Design of Business
- opposable thumb
