= The Design of Business =

2009 book by Roger Martin

The Design of Business: Why Design Thinking is the Next Competitive Advantage
- Author: Roger Martin
- Language: English
- Genre: Non-fiction
- Publication date: 2009
- ISBN: 978-1422177808

The Design of Business: Why Design Thinking is the Next Competitive Advantage is a 2009 book by Roger Martin, Dean of the University of Toronto's Rotman School of Management. In the book, Martin describes the concept of design thinking, and how companies can incorporate it into their organizational structure for long term innovation and results.

== Book summary ==
Martin introduces the knowledge funnel as the process followed by leading businesses to innovate more consistently and successfully. The knowledge funnel has three different phases:

Mystery → Heuristic → Algorithm

The mystery stage comprises the exploration of the problem, this transitions to the rule of thumb (heuristic) stage, where a rule of thumb is generated to narrow work to a manageable size. In the algorithm stage the general heuristic is converted to a fixed formula, taking the problem from complexity to simplicity.

Martin poses that there are currently two forms of business thinking: Analytical thinking and Intuitive thinking. Analytical thinking is driven by a quantitative process, standardizing to eliminate judgment, bias, and variation. Intuitive thinking focuses more on an instinct to drive creativity and innovation. Analytical thinking has become much more prevalent in organizations, because it is more consistent, easier to measure, and can scale in size. Martin labels the difference between a bias for the two schools of thought as the distinction between 'reliability' versus 'validity'. Organizations are much more likely to favor what is reliable, because their structures motivate analytical thinking. This means that organizations are often poor at achieving valid solutions because they do not fully take advantage of all three areas of the knowledge tunnel, just the two latter stages (heuristics and algorithms).

Design thinking balances analytical and intuitive thinking. It combines an openness to explorative thoughts with an exploitative mentality, striking the balance between innovation and a systematic scalable process. It pulls resources back into the knowledge funnel and allows to progress through all three stages.

Martin argues that business is currently missing abductive reasoning, the third form of logic (deductive logic and inductive logic being other two). Charles Sanders Peirce formed the idea of abductive logic, arguing that no new idea could come from inductive or deductive logic. Peirce described the process of discovery as new ideas that arose when thinkers observed data that did not fit with the existing models. The first step of reasoning was not observation but wondering. Designers live in the world of abductive logic, actively looking for new data points and changing the way that things are done. Incorporating this into organizational structures allows firms to become better at the mystery stage of the knowledge funnel.

The way organizations implement these findings depends on the structure and makeup of the organization. CEOs like Mike Lazaridis at Research in Motion, lead the design thinking by example. An alternative is a new corporate structure that incorporates design thinking into the firm, like the one A.G. Lafley put in place at Procter and Gamble. Similarly, a hybrid model, with a CEO who leads by example but also has a creative structure in place to encourage design thinking, can work well; the best example is Apple under Steve Jobs.

From a personal development standpoint, Martin advocates using and combining some of the tools discussed in his earlier book, The Opposable Mind, to develop the design thinking mindset.

- Stance: positioning oneself with a mindset to acquire the skills to become a successful design thinker.
- Tools: taking the opportunity to develop skills that will improve thought processes and creativity.
- Experiences: exposing oneself to challenging situations, different variations, and reinforcing ones design thinking.

Martin acknowledges that design thinking may meet criticism, so he suggests the following steps to get along with others while practicing it:

1. Rephrase extreme views as a creative challenge
2. Empathize with colleagues on the extremes.
3. Argue in terms of reliability and validity.
4. Put unfamiliar concepts in familiar terms.
5. When it comes to proof, test on small scale first to illustrate successful outcomes, then scale up

== Reaction ==
Reviews have generally been positive, citing the book as "easy reading, because he is an excellent storyteller, and illustrates his thesis with memorable examples". He has also been praised for the practical approach he takes, grounding his ideas in the reality of the system, with reviewers calling it a "must-read for people who want to bake into their corporate cultures ingredients such as research, design and innovation." Others have praised it as cutting-edge and a necessary approach for modern companies.
