= Lifetime income tax =

Proposal for new type of income tax

Lifetime income tax is a proposal for a new type of income tax that would tax a person based on their cumulative income over their lifetime up until the filing date. This is in contrast to most income tax systems where the previous yearly income is the basis for the tax calculation.

== Academic history ==
Currently, lifetime income tax has been proposed by a small group of academics and politicians, mainly in Canada and the United States, as an alternative tax formulation.

Roger Martin, Dean of the University of Toronto's Rotman School of Management and Herwig Schlunk, Professor of Law at Vanderbilt University Law School both have written articles proposing the idea.

== Policy proposals ==
In 2004, Tony Clement proposed reforming Canada's taxation system to include a lifetime income tax as part of his run for leadership of the Conservative Party of Canada. This plan would have exempted from income tax anyone who had not yet earned $250,000 over their lifetime. Clement proposed this reform after discussions with Martin and said it would have made the tax system simpler and fairer, while reducing the "brain drain" of younger Canadians moving to the United States for better jobs. Clement also claimed that the $250,000 exemption would make the first 8–10 years of the average Canadian's working life income tax-free. After that point, each next $250,000 of lifetime earnings would taxed at a progressively higher rates (14% rate until reaching $500,000, 20% until reaching $750,000, 24% until reaching $1 million, and 27% above $1 million). Critics argued that the system would actually increase taxation complexity, increase effective tax burdens, and increase taxation on older people and single families.

Stephen Harper won the leadership election on the first ballot and Clement's ideas received no further significant airing.

== Other proposed income tax systems ==
- Flat tax
- Negative income tax
