= Durk Jager =

Durk I. Jager
- Born: April 30, 1943
- Died: April 3, 2022 (aged 78)
- Education: Erasmus University Rotterdam
- Employer: Chiquita Brands International
- Title: Director
- Term: December 2002-present
- Successor: A. G. Lafley (as CEO of P&G)

Durk I. Jager (30 April 1943 – 3 April 2022) was a Dutch and American businessman, private investor and consultant. As of 2012, he was the director of Chiquita Brands International (since December 2002).

He was the CEO of Procter & Gamble from 1 September 1999 to 2000. He has served on the board of directors of Eastman Kodak & United Negro College Fund, on the board of governors of The Nature Conservancy, as the chairman of the Japan America Society of Greater Cincinnati, and a member of the International Council, J.P. Morgan & Co.

Durk I. Jager was indicated in the Doe v. Chiquita Brands International in which he was accused of supplying the far-right wing terrorist group United Self-Defense Forces of Colombia with US$1.7 million, 3,400 AK-47 rifles and 4 million rounds of ammunition.

== Biography ==
Durk Jager is a native of Haskerland, Netherlands. He joined Procter & Gamble in 1970, after graduating from the Erasmus University Rotterdam in the same year. He became a general manager of the company's Japan subsidiary in 1985, and then Vice President in 1987. In 1988, he was made responsible for the company's Far East and Asia Pacific divisions. In 1989, he was elected to the board of directors.

In 1990, Jager became the executive vice president with responsibility for the Soap, Chemicals, Health Care and Beauty Care divisions. He was given the responsibility for the company's US business in 1991. In 1995, he was named president and chief operating officer.

Durk became the CEO of P&G in 1999, at a time when P&G was in the midst of a corporate restructuring exercise started in September 1998. He decided to overhaul the product development, testing and launch processes. He believed that there was a need to change the P&G employees who had been used to lifetime employment and a conservative management style. He led an ambitious six-year restructuring effort called "Organization 2005", which intended to boost sales and profits via introduction of new products as well as elimination of unnecessary jobs. However, the $1.9 billion effort cut into P&G profits, and Jager resigned abruptly in 2000.

== Positions held ==
- CEO, President and Chairman of Board of Directors, Procter & Gamble (1999–2000)
- President, (1995–2000)
- Executive Vice President (EVP), Procter & Gamble (1990–95)
- Vice President (VP), Procter & Gamble (1987–90)
- Member of the Board of Directors, Chiquita Brands International (December 2002–present)
- Member of the Board of Kodak Eastment (1998–2007)
- Member of the Board of Polycom (2003–08)
