= Peter Macklem =

Canadian doctor and administrator

Peter Macklem OC FRSC FRCPC
- Born: Peter Tiffany Macklem; October 4, 1931; Kingston, Ontario, Canada
- Died: February 11, 2011 (aged 79); Brockville, Ontario, Canada
- Occupations: Doctor; medical researcher; hospital administrator
- Spouse: Joy Belcourt
- Children: 5
- Relatives: Tiff Macklem (nephew)

Peter Tiffany Macklem OC FRSC FRCPC (October 4, 1931 – February 11, 2011) was a Canadian doctor, medical researcher and hospital administrator.

== Life ==
Peter Tiffany Macklem was born in 1931 in Kingston, Ontario, and grew up there. He was educated at Queen's University and McGill University Medical School, receiving his MD, CM from McGill in 1956.

He married Joy Belcourt and had five children. A resident of the Thousand Islands area, he helped lead the campaign (still in progress) to have the Saint Lawrence River named a Canadian Heritage River. He was also president of the Thousand Islands Area Residents' Association.

He died suddenly at home in Brockville, Ontario, in 2011, at the age of 79.

His nephew, Tiff Macklem, serves as the 10th governor of the Bank of Canada.

== Medical career ==
Macklem trained as a resident in internal medicine at the Royal Victoria Hospital (RVH) and then became a research fellow in the cardio-respiratory service for the hospital. This formed the basis for his lifelong interest in the mechanics of breathing. In 1963, he became a fellow of the Royal College of Physicians and Surgeons of Canada. In 1967, Maklem became director of the Respiratory division at the RVH.

In 1972, he became a professor of Medicine at McGill and senior physician at the RVH. He was founding director of the Meakins-Christie Laboratories at McGill from 1972 to 1979. In 1979, he became chief physician at the RVH and, the following year, chair of the Department of Medicine at McGill. In 1987, he became chief physician at the Montreal Chest Institute.

== Research ==
Macklem pioneered the study of small airway physiology in the lungs and demonstrated the early lung damage caused by smoking. He was an early explorer of the concept of respiratory muscle fatigue and shone a light on its role in respiratory disease.

== Awards and honors ==
In 1982, he was named a Fellow of the Royal Society of Canada and, in 1988, an Officer of the Order of Canada.

In 1999, he was awarded the Trudeau Medal of the American Lung Association and the Gairdner Foundation Wightman Award. In 2003, he was awarded the Prix Michel-Sarrazin. Macklem was inducted into the Canadian Medical Hall of Fame in 2012.
