= Integrative thinking =

Reframing Critical Thinking Skills (CTS) for Group-Decision-Support-Systems (GDSS)

Integrative thinking is a field that was developed by Graham Douglas in 1986. It is defined as the process of integrating intuition, reason, and imagination in a human mind to develop a holistic continuum of strategy, tactics, action, review, and evaluation. This may be achieved by applying the SOARA (Satisfying, Optimum, Achievable Results Ahead) process to any problem. The SOARA Process facilitates finding associations between what may have been regarded as unrelated parts of a problem.

== Definition used by Roger Martin ==
Integrative thinking is a discipline and methodology for solving complex or wicked problems. The theory was originally created by Roger Martin, Dean of the Rotman School of Management at the University of Toronto, and collaboratively developed with his colleague Mihnea C. Moldoveanu, Director of the Desautels Centre for Integrative Thinking.

The Rotman School of Management defines integrative thinking as:

"...the ability to constructively face the tensions of opposing models, and instead of choosing one at the expense of the other, generating a creative resolution of the tension in the form of a new model that contains elements of the individual models, but is superior to each."

The website continues:

"Integrative thinkers build models rather than choose between them. Their models include consideration of numerous variables — customers, employees, competitors, capabilities, cost structures, industry evolution, and regulatory environment — not just a subset of the above. Their models capture the complicated, multi-faceted, and multidirectional causal relationships between the key variables in any problem. Integrative thinkers consider the problem as a whole, rather than breaking it down and farming out the parts. Finally, they creatively resolve tensions without making costly trade-offs, turning challenges into opportunities."

== Background ==
To develop the theory of integrative thinking, Martin interviewed more than 50 successful leaders, from the fields of business (Jack Welch, AG Lafley, Nandan Nilekani), the arts (Atom Egoyan, Piers Handling) and the not-for-profit world (Victoria Hale). He spoke with these leaders, some for more than 8 hours, about the decisions that they had made over their careers and about how they thought through those decisions. What he found was that some of them had a distinct common characteristic - "the predisposition and capacity to hold two diametrically opposing ideas in their heads. And then, without panicking or simply settling for one alternative or the other, they're able to produce a synthesis that is superior to either opposing idea."

== Theory ==
Integrative thinkers differ from conventional thinkers in many dimensions. They tend to consider most variables of a problem to be salient. Rather than seeking to simplify a problem as much as possible, they are inclined to seek out alternative views and contradictory data. They are willing to embrace a more complex understanding of how those salient features interconnect and influence one another, and a more complex understanding of causality. Rather than limiting the possible causal relationships to simple, linear, one-way dynamics, they entertain the possibility that causal forces may be multi-directional (i.e. circular) and complex. Integrative thinkers approach problem architecture differently. Rather than try to deal with elements in piece parts or sequentially, they strive at all times to keep the whole of the problem in mind while working on the individual parts. When faced with two opposing options that seem to force a trade-off, integrative thinkers strive for a creative resolution of the tension rather than simply accepting the choice in front of them.

== See also ==
- Critical thinking
- Causality
- Decision support system
- Design thinking
- Paradox
- Systems thinking
- Thesis, antithesis, synthesis
- Thought
- Cognitive dissonance
