= John Crispo =

Canadian economist, author and educator

1st Dean of the University of Toronto Faculty of Management Studies
- In office 1972 – 1975
- Preceded by: Position established
- Succeeded by: Roger Wolff

Personal details
- Born: 5 May 1933
- Died: 27 April 2009 (aged 75)

John H. G. Crispo (5 May 1933 – 27 April 2009) was a Canadian economist, author and educator.

Crispo graduated with a Bachelor of Commerce from the University of Toronto and with a Doctor of Philosophy at the Massachusetts Institute of Technology.

In 2006, he became a municipal politician, the Ward 3 councillor for Clearview Township in Central Ontario.

He became a noted supporter of the Canada-United States Free Trade Agreement.

Eighteen years after being diagnosed with prostate cancer, Crispo died at Princess Margaret Hospital, Toronto aged 75.

He became the first dean of the University of Toronto's Rotman School of Management (then known as the Faculty of Management Studies), from when it was established in 1972 to 1975. He was active in the Faculty thereafter where he was designated professor emeritus.

== Books ==
- 2002: Rebel Without a Pause: Memoirs of a Canadian Maverick (Warwick) ISBN 1-894622-27-8
- 1992: Making Canada Work: Competing in the Global Economy, (1992, Random House) ISBN 0-394-22287-3
- 1990: Can Canada Compete? (Hemlock) ISBN 0-929066-04-9
- 1988: Free Trade: The Real Story (Gage) ISBN 0-7715-5110-X
- 1984: National consultation : problems and prospects (C. D. Howe Institute) ISBN 0-88806-125-0
- 1979: Mandate For Canada (General Publishing) ISBN 0-7736-1051-0
- 1978: Industrial democracy in western Europe: a North American perspective (McGraw-Hill Ryerson) ISBN 0-07-082700-1
- 1978: The Canadian industrial relations system (McGraw-Hill Ryerson) ISBN 0-07-082459-2
- 1975: The public right to know : accountability in the secretive society (McGraw-Hill Ryerson) ISBN 0-07-082248-4
- 1967: International unionism : a study in Canadian-American relations (McGraw-Hill)
- 1966: (editor) Industrial relations : challenges and responses (University of Toronto Press)
