= Phase-gate process =

Type of project management technique

A phase-gate process (also referred to as a waterfall process) is a project management technique in which an initiative or project (e.g., new product development, software development, process improvement, business change) is divided into distinct stages or phases, separated by decision points (known as gates).

At each gate, continuation is decided by (typically) a manager, steering committee, or governance board. The decision is made based on forecasts and information available at the time, including the business case, risk analysis, and availability of necessary resources (e.g., money, people with correct competencies).

== History ==
A phased approach to investment decisions for development arose in large-scale projects for mechanical and chemical engineering, particularly since the 1940s. One source described eight phases. In 1958, the American Association of Cost Engineers created four standard cost estimate type classifications to match these development and approval phases. Other industries with complex products and projects picked up on the process. For example, NASA practiced the concept of phased development in the 1960s with its phased project planning or what is often called phased review process. The phased review process was intended to break up the development of any project into a series of phases that could be individually reviewed in sequence. Review points at the end of each phase required that a number of criteria be met before the project could progress to the next phase. The phased review process consisted of five phases with periodic development reviews between phases. NASA's phased review process is considered a first generation process because it did not take into consideration the analysis of external markets in new product development.

The waterfall process variant arose through publication of Winston Royce's paper on large developments, as it illustrated work cascading down from each phase as a series of waterfalls from which work could not return to an earlier phase.

Phase-gate processes are often called front-end loading or big design up front.

== Effective gates ==
Most firms suffer from having far too many projects in their product development pipelines, for the limited resources available. "Gates with teeth" help to prune the development portfolio of weak projects and deal with a gridlocked pipeline. Also, a robust innovation strategy, coupled with strategic buckets, refocuses resources on high value development initiatives.

Note that gates are not merely project review points, status reports or information updates. Rather, they are tough decision meetings, where the critical go/kill and prioritization decisions are made on projects. Thus the gates become the quality control check points in the process ensuring that the right projects move forward and are completed correctly.

=== Acceptance criteria ===
Gates must have clear and visible criteria so that senior managers can make go/kill and prioritization decisions objectively. Most importantly, these criteria must be effective—that is, they must be operational (easy to use), realistic (make use of available information) and discriminating (differentiate the good projects from the mediocre ones). These criteria can be:

- Must meet: Knock-out questions in a check list, designed to kill poor projects outright
- Should meet: Highly desirable characteristics which are rated and added in a point-count scheme

==== Example ====
A sample list of criteria is shown below, from which a scorecard can be developed that can then be used to score projects at a gate meeting.

- Must meet (checklist - yes/no)
  - Strategic alignment (fits business unit strategy)
  - Reasonable likelihood of technical feasibility
  - Meet EH&S policies
  - Positive return versus risk
- Should meet (scored on 0-10 scale)
  - Strategic
    - Degree to which projects aligns with business unit strategy
    - Strategic importance
  - Product advantage
    - Unique benefits
    - Meets customer needs better than existing or competing product
    - Value for money
  - Market attractiveness
    - Market size
    - Market growth
    - Competitive situation
  - Synergies (leverages core competencies)
    - Marketing synergies
    - Technological synergies
    - Manufacturing / processing synergies
  - Technical feasibility
    - Technical gap
    - Complexity
    - Technical uncertainty
  - Operational viability
    - Go to market
    - Sales, marketing, and billing
    - Support and operation
  - Risk versus return
    - Expected profitability (e.g., net present value)
    - Return (e.g., internal rate of return)
    - Payback period
    - Certainty of return

If the answers are "no" or "low" to many of these questions, the decision should be to send the project back for reconsideration, (such as, to adjust the scope, timelines, funding, or solution) or to kill it off altogether.

== Advantages and disadvantages ==
=== Advantages ===
The advantages to using the phase-gate process for product development typically result from its ability to identify problems and assess progress before the project's conclusion. Poorly performing projects can be rejected by disciplined use of the process. Using the phase-gate process on a large project can help reduce complexity of what could be a large and limiting innovation process into a straightforward rule-based approach. When a phase-gate process incorporates cost and fiscal analysis tools such as net present value, the organization can potentially be provided with quantitative information regarding the feasibility of developing potential product ideas. Finally, the process is an opportunity to validate the updated business case by a project's executive sponsors.

=== Disadvantages ===
One problem with the phase-gate process is the potential for structural organization to interfere with creativity and innovation, as overly structured processes may cause creativity to be reduced in importance and to hinder the largely iterative process of innovation.

== Opportunity management ==
The opportunity management funnel is a visual representation of phase-gate decision making. Opportunity management is defined as "a process to identify business and community development opportunities that could be implemented to sustain or improve a local economy." The components of opportunity management are:

1. Identifying opportunities.
2. Evaluating and prioritizing these opportunities - This may involve developing criteria, deliberating, and ranking the alternatives.
3. Driving opportunities - Involves assigning leads, accountability, action plans, and project management
4. Constant monitoring - May require one of the following actions:
  - Advance - Commit additional resources to move the idea forward
  - Rework - More investigation/ rethinking
  - Kill - Stop working on the idea and move on

The goal of the opportunity management funnel is to eliminate weak or bad ideas before money or resources are contributed to realize these opportunities. The benefit of the opportunity management funnel when utilizing phase-gate decision making is that the funnel generates efficiencies where weak ideas are efficiently eliminated leaving a strong set of viable alternatives. To fulfill its mandate, the opportunity management funnel filters the broadest range of opportunities and ensures that all priority sectors are represented. When selecting which opportunities to filter through the process, economic developers should be aware that initially, there are no bad ideas or limits. The unviable alternatives will be filtered out throughout the process using phase-gate decision-making process
