= Tony Clement =

Canadian politician (born 1961)

The Honourable Tony Clement PC ECO
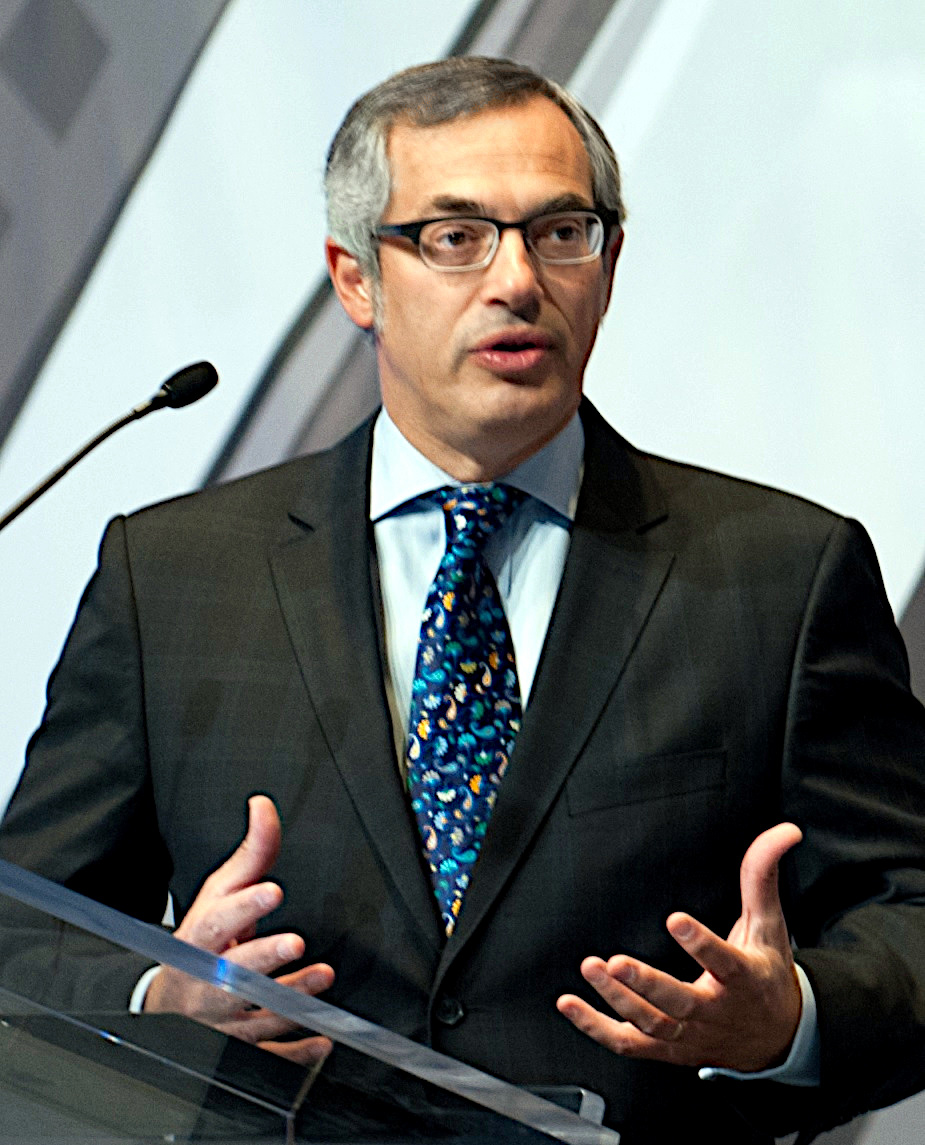
- Clement in 2012

President of the Treasury Board
- In office May 18, 2011 – November 4, 2015
- Prime Minister: Stephen Harper
- Preceded by: Stockwell Day
- Succeeded by: Scott Brison

Minister of Industry
- In office October 30, 2008 – May 18, 2011
- Prime Minister: Stephen Harper
- Preceded by: Jim Prentice
- Succeeded by: Christian Paradis

Minister of Health
- In office February 6, 2006 – October 30, 2008
- Prime Minister: Stephen Harper
- Preceded by: Ujjal Dosanjh
- Succeeded by: Leona Aglukkaq

Member of Parliament for Parry Sound-Muskoka
- In office January 23, 2006 – October 19, 2019
- Preceded by: Andy Mitchell
- Succeeded by: Scott Aitchison

Minister of Health and Long-Term Care
- In office February 8, 2001 – October 22, 2003
- Premier: Mike Harris; Ernie Eves
- Preceded by: Elizabeth Witmer
- Succeeded by: George Smitherman

Minister of Municipal Affairs and Housing
- In office October 25, 1999 – February 8, 2001
- Premier: Mike Harris
- Preceded by: Steve Gilchrist
- Succeeded by: Chris Hodgson

Minister of the Environment
- In office June 17, 1999 – March 3, 2000
- Premier: Mike Harris
- Preceded by: Norm Sterling
- Succeeded by: Dan Newman

Minister of Transportation
- In office October 10, 1997 – June 17, 1999
- Premier: Mike Harris
- Preceded by: Al Palladini
- Succeeded by: David Turnbull

Member of the Ontario Provincial Parliament for Brampton West—Mississauga Brampton South (1995–1999)
- In office June 8, 1995 – September 2, 2003
- Preceded by: Bob Callahan
- Succeeded by: Vic Dhillon

Deputy Chairman of the International Democrat Union
- In office 2014 – November 14, 2019
- Chairman: John Key; Stephen Harper
- Preceded by: David Lidington
- Succeeded by: Brian Loughnane

Personal details
- Born: Tony Peter Panayi; January 27, 1961 (age 65) Manchester, England
- Citizenship: Canada; Cyprus; United Kingdom
- Party: Independent (2018–present)
- Other political affiliations: Progressive Conservative Party of Ontario (provincial; 1995–2003); Canadian Alliance (2000–2003); Conservative (2003–2018)
- Spouse: Lynne Golding
- Children: 3
- Education: University of Toronto (BA, LLB)
- Profession: Politician, lawyer, businessman

Tony Peter Clement (né Panayi; born January 27, 1961) is a Canadian politician who served as a member of the House of Commons of Canada and the Legislative Assembly of Ontario. He was the member of Parliament (MP) for Parry Sound-Muskoka and a federal cabinet minister in the Conservative Party under prime minister Stephen Harper. Before entering federal politics, Clement served as an Ontario member of Provincial Parliament for Brampton South then Brampton West—Mississauga and a cabinet minister in the Progressive Conservative Party of Ontario, including as Minister of Health and Long-Term Care under premiers Mike Harris and Ernie Eves.

He was a candidate for the leadership of the Conservative Party of Canada after its formation from the merger of the Progressive Conservative and Canadian Alliance parties in 2003, but lost to Stephen Harper. Clement won the seat of Parry Sound-Muskoka in the 2006 federal election, defeating incumbent Liberal cabinet minister Andy Mitchell. The Conservatives formed government in that election and Clement was appointed Minister of Health and Minister for FedNor. He later served as Minister of Industry and President of the Treasury Board. He was re-elected in the 2015 election despite the Conservative defeat, and announced his second bid for the leadership of the Conservative Party on July 12, 2016, but withdrew that October.

From his initial election as MP in 2006, Clement sat as a Conservative member until he resigned at the request of Conservative leader Andrew Scheer on November 7, 2018, due to a sexting scandal.

== Early life and career ==
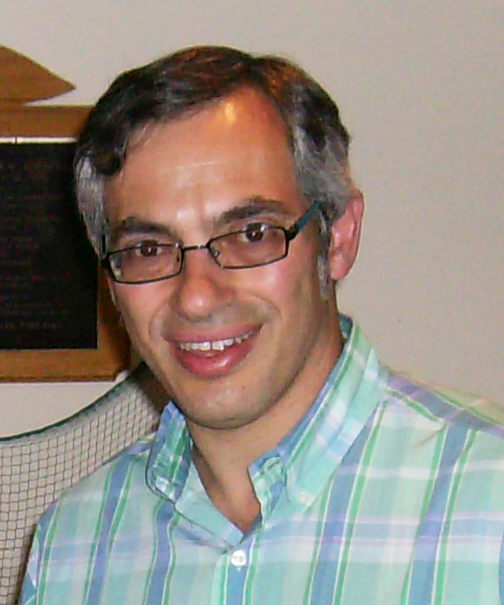
Tony Clement in 2007.

Clement was born Tony Peter Panayi in Manchester, England, the son of Carol Ann (née Drapkin) and Peter Panayi. His father was a Greek Cypriot and his mother was Jewish (part of her family had immigrated from Aleppo, Syria). He emigrated to Canada in childhood with his parents when he was four years old. His parents divorced and his mother married Ontario politician John Clement, with Tony adopting his stepfather's surname soon after.

As a student at the University of Toronto, Clement was elected twice, both as an undergraduate and as a law student, to the university's Governing Council. He was also president of the campus Progressive Conservatives. He first attracted the attention of the media in 1986, when he created a new society to invite the South African ambassador to Canada, Glenn Babb, to speak after the International Law Society had withdrawn its invitation, deeming it too controversial because of the issue of apartheid. Clement argued in favour of inviting Babb on the grounds of free speech. An attempt by four law professors for a court injunction barring "any representative of the Republic of South Africa to expound, explain or otherwise to solicit public support for his Government's policy of apartheid" was rejected by the court. He completed degrees in political science in 1983 and law in 1986, and was called to the Ontario Bar in 1988.

He unsuccessfully ran for Metro Toronto Council in 1994, losing to future mayor David Miller in the ward of Parkdale-High Park.

Clement is married to Lynne Golding, a partner and Chair of the Health Law Practice at the international law firm, Fasken Martineau DuMoulin.

== Provincial politics ==
Clement became president of the Progressive Conservative Party of Ontario (PC) in 1990 and was a close ally of then-party leader Mike Harris; he served as Harris's assistant principal secretary from 1992 to 1995 and played a leading role in drafting policy directives for the Common Sense Revolution. He was elected to the Legislative Assembly of Ontario in the provincial election of 1995, defeating incumbent Liberal Bob Callahan by over 6,000 votes in the riding of Brampton South. He served as a Parliamentary Assistant for two years, initially to the Minister of Citizenship, Culture and Recreation, then to the Deputy Premier; he was then elevated to the cabinet as Minister of Transportation on October 10, 1997. He also represented the Progressive Conservative government on a variety of televised discussion panels, gaining the reputation of a rising star in the party.

Clement was returned in the provincial election of 1999 in the new riding of Brampton West—Mississauga, defeating Liberal candidate Vic Dhillon by over 8,000 votes. He was reassigned as Minister of the Environment on June 17, 1999, and served in this capacity until May 3, 2000. In this role, he implemented the program known as Ontario's Drive Clean, which mandated periodic emissions tests on vehicles in Southern Ontario.

He was appointed Minister of Municipal Affairs and Housing on October 25, 1999, and held this position until February 8, 2001, when he was named Minister of Health and Long-Term Care. He initiated primary care reform, oversaw the implementation of Telehealth Ontario (a toll-free health information line staffed by registered nurses) and expanded Ontario's hospitals system. Clement also entered into a public-private partnership for a hospital redevelopment in Brampton.

Following Harris's resignation, Clement ran in the 2002 Ontario PC leadership election, finishing third on the first ballot behind Ernie Eves and Jim Flaherty. Clement then placed his support in the second ballot behind Eves, who emerged victorious, and stayed on as health minister in the Eves ministry. He was especially prominent when Toronto suffered an outbreak of SARS in 2003, travelling to Geneva in a successful bid to urge the World Health Organization to lift a travel ban to Canada's largest city.

The Eves government was defeated in the 2003 provincial election, and Clement was unseated by Vic Dhillon by about 2,500 votes in a rematch of 1999. Clement afterwards worked as a counsel for Bennett Jones LLP; he was also a small business owner and a visiting professor at the University of Toronto Faculty of Law.

== Federal politics ==
Clement first became prominent in federal politics in 2000, sitting on the steering committee for the United Alternative. This initiative was meant to provide a framework for the Reform Party and Progressive Conservative Party to unite under a single banner. It did not accomplish this end, but nonetheless led to the formation of the Canadian Alliance from the Reform Party later that year; Clement served as the Alliance's founding president.

Following his defeat in the 2003 provincial election, Clement declared himself a candidate for the leadership of the new Conservative Party of Canada. He placed third in the party's leadership vote, behind Belinda Stronach and winner Stephen Harper. He then ran as the Conservative Party candidate in Brampton West in the 2004 federal election, but lost to Liberal incumbent Colleen Beaumier by about 3,500 votes.

For his second attempt to win a seat in the House of Commons of Canada, he switched to the Parry Sound-Muskoka riding in the 2006 election. On election night, he was declared the winner by 21 votes. Upon conclusion of the judicial recount, Clement was found to have defeated the incumbent Andy Mitchell by 28 votes: 18,513-18,485. He was re-elected in Parry Sound—Muskoka in the 2008, 2011 and 2015 elections.

Clement pledged to extend an existing measure to require disclosure of meetings by only registered lobbyists with lower-level government officials who have decision-making power.

=== Minister of Health ===
On February 6, 2006, Clement was appointed as Minister of Health by Prime Minister Stephen Harper. Some of Clement's initiatives included announcing a national strategy on autism, working towards establishing Canada's first Patient Wait Times Guarantees, and investing in faster, more effective and safer health information systems across Canada for Canadians.

One of Clement's first initiatives as Minister of Health was establishing the Canadian Partnership Against Cancer, an independent not-for-profit organization committed to combating this disease and improving patients' quality of life.

In 2006, Clement launched the Public Health Scholarship and Capacity Building Initiative — ongoing scholarships supporting public health training and positions across Canada. Furthermore, in 2006, he announced the $1-billion compensation package for pre-1986/post-1990 forgotten victims of the tainted blood scandal, who were neglected in the 1998 settlement agreement.

Clement also played a key role in launching the Chemical Management Plan, which the Conservative government claimed "made Canada a world leader in chemical management". "We have established clear priorities and now we are taking action to protect the health of Canadians," said Clement. Further, the government claimed "Canada was the first nation in the world to take action to prohibit the importation, sale and advertising of baby bottles that contain BPA".

On September 29, 2007, the CBC reported Clement's new strategy to combat the growing drug abuse problem in Canada. "The party is over" for illicit drug users, he announced, with the new policy aiming towards widespread arrest of drug users, in contrast to the old strategy of targeting dealers. Over 130 physicians and scientists signed a petition condemning the Conservative government's "potentially deadly" misrepresentation of the positive evidence for harm reduction programs. Clement stated that governments in Canada have been sending the wrong message about drug use, and he wanted to clear up the mixed messages going out on illicit drugs.

Also in 2007, Clement launched the new Canada's Food Guide, the first update in 15 years incorporating the most up-to-date information based on current nutritional science and a new interactive web section.

=== Minister responsible for the Federal Economic Development Initiative for Northern Ontario ===
On February 6, 2006, in addition to being appointed Minister of Health, Clement was also appointed Minister responsible for the Federal Economic Development Initiative for Northern Ontario (FedNor). He held the position until November 2015.

=== Minister of Industry ===
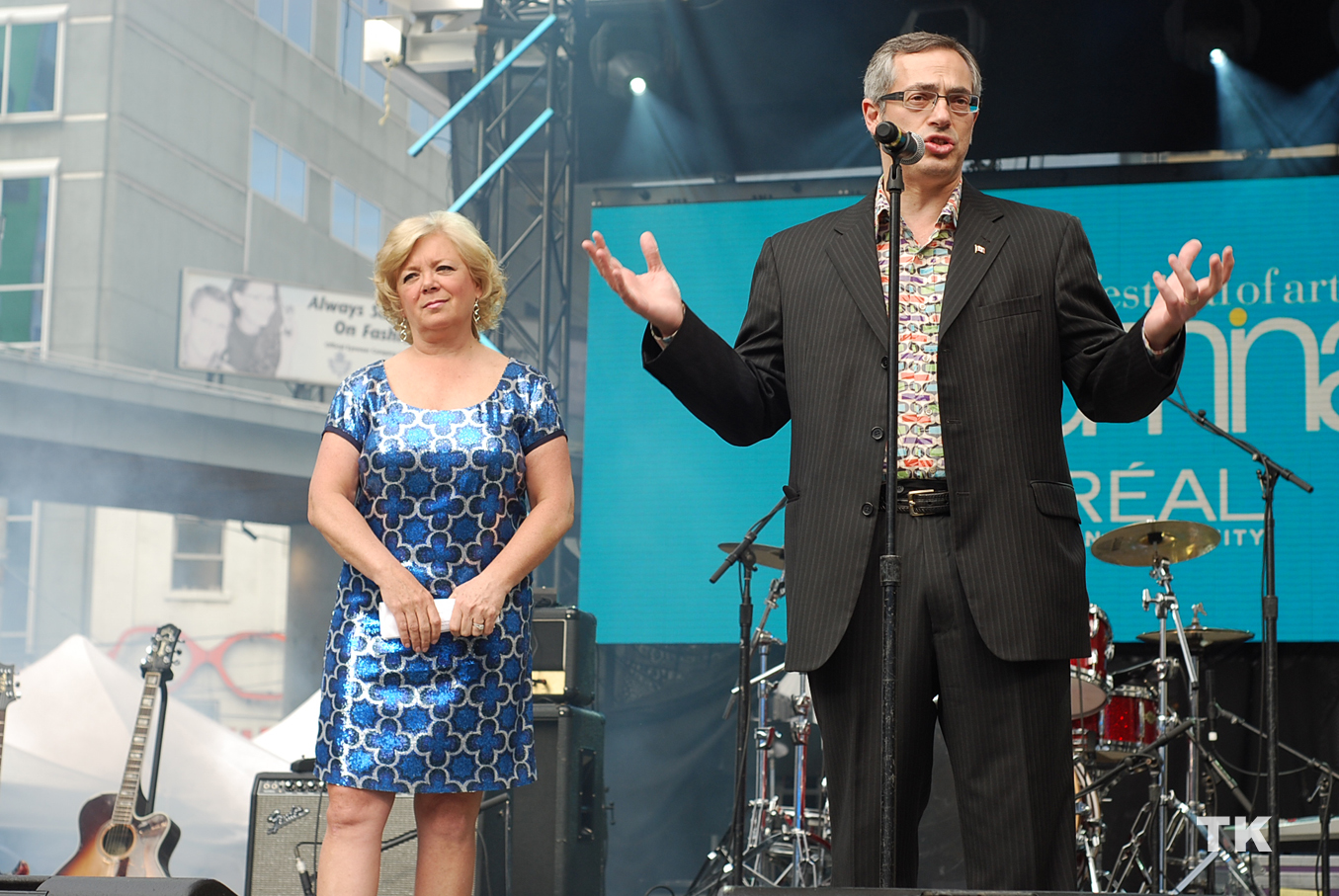
Tony Clement speaking at Luminato 2010 in Toronto.

On October 30, 2008, Clement was sworn into the office of Industry Minister. This included the appointment to the Office of the Registrar General of Canada.

Shortly after becoming Industry Minister, Clement launched the Knowledge Infrastructure Program, a two-year $2-billion measure that supported infrastructure enhancement at post-secondary institutions across Canada.

In conjunction with the US and Ontario governments, Clement worked closely on the restructuring of GM and Chrysler. Following the restructuring, he stated that the companies would "now be in a position to operate a sustainable and viable business that will keep production, innovation and jobs in Canada. This is good news for Canadian auto workers, the Canadian auto parts supply chain and for Canadian consumers. Moving forward, the Government of Canada will continue to work toward removing our country's auto industry, while exercising rigorous oversight of taxpayer money."

In the summer of 2010, Clement introduced changes to the 2011 Census. On this issue, he said, "The government will retain the mandatory short form that will collect basic demographic information. To meet the need for additional information, and to respect the privacy wishes of Canadians, the government has introduced the voluntary National Household Survey (NHS)." The change sparked significant criticism, including the resignation of Statistics Canada's Chief Statistician (see Voluntary long-form survey controversy). Other changes included the addition of questions about the languages spoken by Canadians.

On November 14, 2010, BHP Billiton withdrew its hostile $39-billion offer for Saskatchewan's PotashCorp. At a news conference following the withdrawal, Clement explained that of the six Investment Canada Act guidelines that determine if an investment has a "net benefit", he said BHP Billiton's bid failed to meet three of them. Clement said the Government felt the takeover would not have a beneficial effect on Canada's competitiveness in world markets.

In January 2011, Clement spoke out against a ruling of the Canadian Radio-television and Telecommunications Commission (CRTC) which allowed usage-based billing for wholesale clients and smaller internet service providers. Citing concerns about how the change could adversely affect consumers, small businesses and entrepreneurs, he warned that if they did not revise the decision, the government would intervene. The CRTC initiated its own review of the ruling, and reversed its decision.

In the lead-up to the 2010 G8 summit, Clement was involved in directing $50 million of border security money for largely unrelated projects in his own riding, a practice commonly known as "pork barrelling". Auditor-General Sheila Fraser issued a report criticizing the minister for breaking the rules and "complained that there was no paperwork to determine how the hundreds of proposals" for spending were narrowed to the 32 projects that were approved. Clement later admitted that this process was not subject to the oversight that it should have been.

=== President of the Treasury Board ===
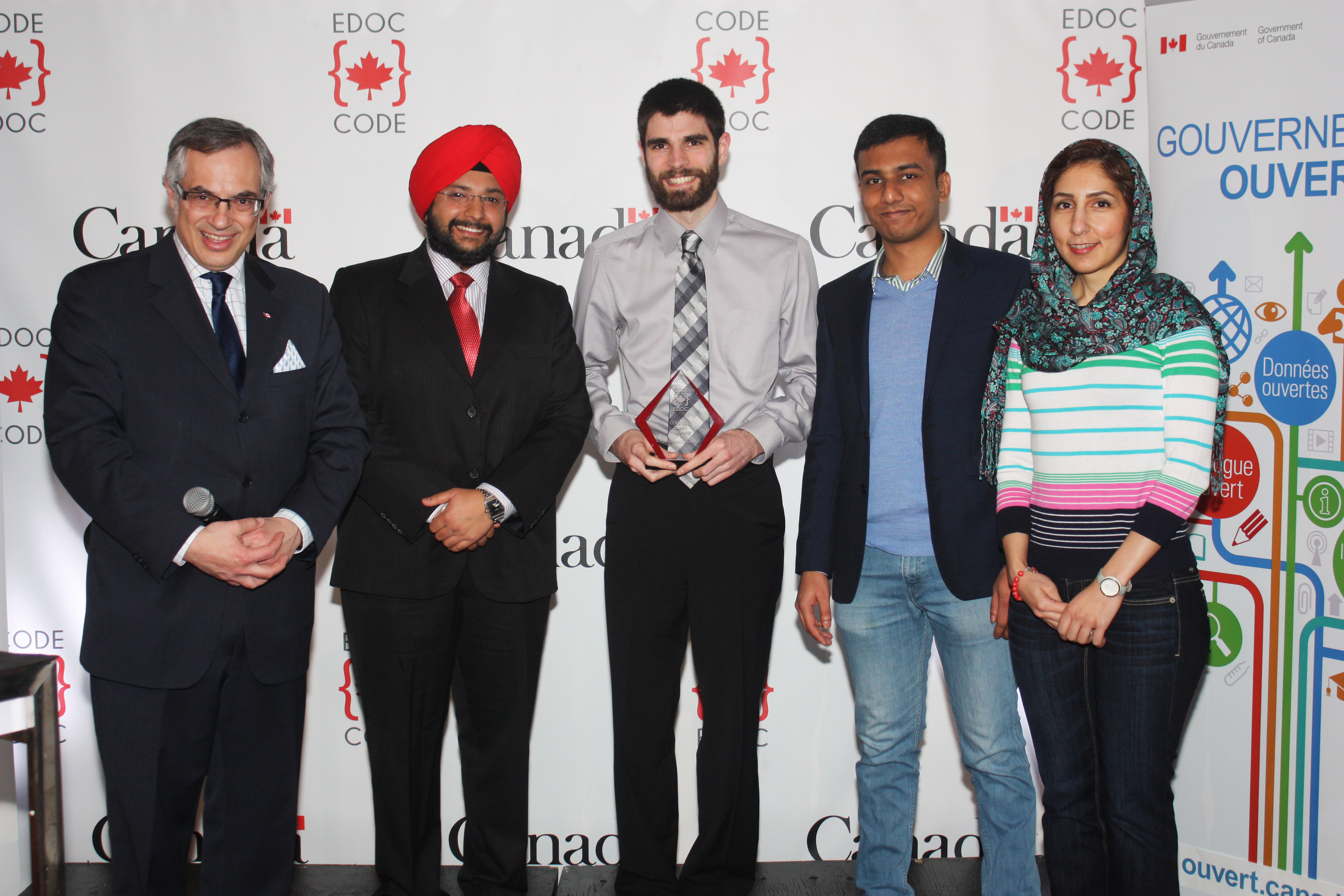
Tony Clement, President of the Treasury Board at Simon Fraser University

Shortly after the May 2, 2011 election, Clement was appointed as the President of the Treasury Board. Consistent with the Conservative Party's election platform, Clement has been tasked with leading a government-wide spending review, with the goal of finding ways to contain government spending.

On November 2, 2013, Clement backed a motion at the Conservative Party national convention that advocated clawing back public-sector pay and benefits. At the convention, he vowed, as the minister responsible for negotiations with the civil service, to "alter the dynamics of collective bargaining as it has been done in this country over the last few decades".

On December 22, 2014, Clement was quoted by the Canadian Press as saying that the federal government deliberately withholds public data because people using the information might "create havoc" by altering the contents.

=== Opposition ===
Clement retained his seat in the 2015 general election that defeated the Conservative government. Moving to the Opposition benches, he was appointed the Opposition's critic for foreign affairs by interim Leader of the Opposition Rona Ambrose. He stepped down from the Shadow Cabinet on July 12, 2016, in order to launch his campaign for the leadership of the Conservative Party. He dropped out of the race that October due to not meeting fundraising goals he had set for his campaign, and instead endorsed Maxime Bernier. He also re-joined the shadow cabinet as public safety critic, before being re-assigned as critic on public services and procurement by new party leader Andrew Scheer in August 2017. He was named Shadow Minister for Justice in September 2018.

=== Sexting scandal ===
In early November 2018, Clement resigned his House of Commons committee assignments and his role as Conservative Shadow Minister for Justice. The resignation was filed after he admitted having shared "sexually explicit images and a video of [himself]" with an individual or party that he "believed was a consenting female recipient" but was actually a person that Clement claimed had targeted him for extortion. The Royal Canadian Mounted Police launched an investigation. Clement claimed at first that it was an isolated incident, but it was later found out that it was not.

After additional allegations of improper behaviour were made against Clement on November 7, party leader Andrew Scheer requested that he also resign from the Conservative caucus. Clement did so and continued to sit as an independent MP. In January 2019, two men from the Ivory Coast were arrested in connection with the attempted extortion of Clement. On April 2, Clement announced that he would not be standing as a candidate in the next federal election.

== Recent life ==
Clement joined Wellington Dupont Public Affairs in October 2019 as a senior advisor, before taking on the same position at government relations firm Sandstone Group in March 2024.

In November 2019, Clement started the "And Another Thing" podcast with Jodie Jenkins, which features a weekly interview with a public figure and a discussion between Clement and Jenkins.

Clement served as fundraising director in Pierre Poilievre's successful bid for the Conservative leadership in 2022, and was named to the board of the Conservative Party's fundraising committee that September.

== Political positions ==
Clement has stated that there are circumstances where the death penalty is warranted.

Clement, as Conservative Public Safety Critic, stated in February 2017 that the RCMP needed to "enforce the law" to stop the influx of Syrian Refugees attempting to cross the Canada–United States border in the wake of US President Donald Trump's Executive Order 13769 to ban citizens of certain majority Muslim countries from entering the United States. When a CBC Radio reporter asked Clement in a telephone interview to specify the measures the RCMP must take to do so, he refused to answer and hung up. Clement stated in an interview with Power Play on CTV News Channel that the Conservatives "are calling for two things in particular. One, more resources, more money and funding, and human resources for the border agents and for the RCMP to deal with this much higher influx... Secondly, we want the federal government to develop a plan. What is the plan that is going to be employed or deployed to ensure that the rule of law continues in this country, that the laws are obeyed, that we don't have illegal crossings?"

Clement favoured reforming Canada's taxation system. When running for the Conservative Party leadership he collaborated with Roger Martin on a proposal for a lifetime income tax.

== Electoral record ==
=== Federal ===
2015 Canadian federal election: Parry Sound—Muskoka
Party	Candidate	Votes	%	±%	Expenditures
Conservative	Tony Clement	22,206	43.30	-12.43	$135,346.97
Liberal	Trisha Cowie	19,937	38.88	+27.40	$54,044.00
New Democratic	Matthew McCarthy	5,183	10.11	-14.06	$14,429.33
Green	Glen Hodgson	3,704	7.22	-0.92	$9,993.57
Pirate	Duncan Bell	121	0.24		–
Canadian Action	Gordie Merton	88	0.17		–
Marxist–Leninist	Albert Gray Smith	40	0.08	-0.04	–
Total valid votes/expense limit		51,279	100.00	+10.49	$221,183.08
Total rejected ballots		134	0.26	-0.03	
Turnout		51,413	67.96	+2.85	
Eligible voters		75,642		+4.43	
Conservative hold		Swing		-19.92	
Source(s) "Election Night Results – Parry Sound—Muskoka". Elections Canada. "Final Candidate Election Expenses Limits — 42nd General Election — October 19, 2015".

2011 Canadian federal election: Parry Sound—Muskoka
Party	Candidate	Votes	%	±%	Expenditures
Conservative	Tony Clement	25,864	55.73	+5.55	$ 68,527.11
New Democratic	Wendy Wilson	11,217	24.17	+11.86	16.583.78
Liberal	Cindy Waters	5,330	11.48	-13.51	25,599.58
Green	Glen Hodgson	3,776	8.14	-3.63	12,055.16
Independent	David Carmichael	168	0.36		1,086.61
Marxist–Leninist	Albert Gray Smith	54	0.12		–
Total valid votes/expense limit		46,409	100.00	+6.68	$ 89,717.72
Total rejected ballots		133	0.29	+0.07	
Turnout		46,542	65.11	+2.40	
Eligible voters		71,477		+2.82	
Conservative hold		Swing		-3.16	
Source(s) "Official Voting Results — Forty-First General Election 2011 (Table 11)". Elections Canada. "Official Voting Results — Forty-First General Election 2011 (Table 12)". "Candidate's Electoral Campaign Return – Candidates' Summary (as reviewed by Elections Canada)".

2008 Canadian federal election: Parry Sound—Muskoka
Party	Candidate	Votes	%	±%	Expenditures
Conservative	Tony Clement	21,831	50.19	+10.09	$ 85,379.18
Liberal	Jamie McGarvey	10,871	24.99	−15.05	53,208.34
New Democratic	Jo-Anne Boulding	5,355	12.31	+0.46	11,360.08
Green	Glen Hodgson	5,119	11.77	+3.75	9,469.06
Independent	David Rowland	325	0.75		620.00
Total valid votes/expense limit		43,501	100.0	-5.78	$ 86,569.39
Rejected, unmarked and declined ballots		93	0.21	−0.10	
Turnout		43,594	62.71	−4.83	
Electors on the lists		69,514		+1.37	
Conservative hold		Swing		+12.57	
Source(s) "Official Voting Results — Fortieth General Election 2008 (Table 11)". Elections Canada. "Official Voting Results — Fortieth General Election 2008 (Table 12)". "Candidate's Electoral Campaign Return – Candidates' Summary (As reviewed by Election Canada)".

2006 Canadian federal election: Parry Sound—Muskoka
Party	Candidate	Votes	%	±%	Expenditures
Conservative	Tony Clement	18,513	40.10	+3.75	$ 78,455.14
Liberal	Andy Mitchell	18,485	40.04	−3.82	76,877.80
New Democratic	Jo-Anne Boulding	5,472	11.85	+0.08	17,712.85
Green	Glen Hodgson	3,701	8.02	–	4,700.60
Total valid votes		46,171	100.0	+5.09	$ 80,177.85
Rejected, unmarked and declined ballots		147	0.32	+0.03	
Turnout		46,318	67.54	+3.51	
Electors on the lists		68,577		-0.35	
Conservative gain from Liberal		Swing		+3.78	
Source(s) "Official Voting Results — Thirty-Ninth General Election 2006 (Table 11)". Elections Canada. "Official Voting Results — Thirty-Ninth General Election 2006 (Table 12)". "Candidate's Electoral Campaign Return – Candidates' Summary (As reviewed by Election Canada)".

2004 Canadian federal election: Brampton West
Party	Candidate	Votes	%
Liberal	Colleen Beaumier	21,254	45.4
Conservative	Tony Clement	18,768	40.0
New Democratic	Chris Moise	4,920	10.5
Green	Sanjeev Goel	1,603	3.4
Independent	Tom Bose	371	0.8
Total valid votes		46,916	100.0

=== Provincial ===
2003 Ontario general election: Brampton West—Mississauga
Party	Candidate	Votes	%	±%
Liberal	Vic Dhillon	28,926	46.18	+8.95
Progressive Conservative	Tony Clement	26,414	42.17	-13.70
New Democratic	Chris Moise	5,103	8.15	+1.82
Family Coalition	Paul Micelli	1,122	1.79	–
Green	Paul Simas	811	1.29	–
Freedom	John G. Purdy	266	0.42	–
Total valid votes		62,642	100.0	
Rejected, unmarked and declined ballots		555	0.87	+0.66
Turnout		63,197	51.00	-0.20
Electors on the lists		124,317		–
Liberal gain from Progressive Conservative		Swing		+11.33

1999 Ontario general election: Brampton West—Mississauga
Party	Candidate	Votes	%
Progressive Conservative	Tony Clement	24,909	55.87
Liberal	Vic Dhillon	16,599	37.23
New Democratic	John Devries	2,824	6.33
Natural Law	Mei Sze Viau	252	0.57
Total valid votes		44,584	100.0
Rejected, unmarked and declined ballots		501	0.11
Turnout		45,085	51.20
Electors on the lists		88,003	

1995 Ontario general election: Brampton South
Party	Candidate	Votes	%	±%
Progressive Conservative	Tony Clement	21,859	49.66	+21.16
Liberal	Bob Callahan	15,237	34.62	+2.32
New Democratic	Paul Ledgister	5,676	12.89	-18.31
Family Coalition	Bernie Cissek	1,011	2.2	-4.1
Natural Law	Maxim Newby	229	0.59	
Total valid votes		44,012	100.0	
Rejected, unmarked and declined ballots		501	0.11	
Turnout		44,458	59.70	–
Electors on the lists		74,364		–
Progressive Conservative gain from Liberal		Swing		+18.84

=== Municipal ===
1994 Toronto municipal election: Metro Toronto Councillor, High Park
Candidate	Votes	%
David Miller	7,950	38.03
Andrew Witer	6,845	32.74
Tony Clement	4,722	22.59
Caryl Manning	1,390	6.65
Total valid votes	20,907	100.00

28th Canadian Ministry (2006–2015) – Cabinet of Stephen Harper
Cabinet posts (4)
Predecessor	Office	Successor
Stockwell Day	President of the Treasury Board; 2011–2015	Scott Brison
Jim Prentice	Minister of Industry; 2008–2011	Christian Paradis
Ujjal Dosanjh	Minister of Health; 2006–2008	Leona Aglukkaq
Andy Mitchell	Minister responsible for the Federal Economic Development Initiative for Northern Ontario; 2006–2013	Greg Rickford
Eves ministry, Province of Ontario (2002–2003)
Cabinet post (1)
Predecessor	Office	Successor
Continued from the Harris Ministry	Minister of Health and Long-Term Care; 2002–2003	George Smitherman
Harris ministry, Province of Ontario (1995–2002)
Cabinet posts (4)
Predecessor	Office	Successor
Elizabeth Witmer	Minister of Health and Long-Term Care; 2001–2002	Continued into the Eves Ministry
Steve Gilchrist	Minister of Municipal Affairs and Housing; 1999–2001	Chris Hodgson
Norm Sterling	Minister of the Environment; 1999–2000	Dan Newman
Al Palladini	Minister of Transportation; 1997–1999	David Turnbull
