= Joseph Rotman =

Canadian businessperson and philanthropist

Joseph Rotman OC MSC
- Born: Joseph Louis Rotman; January 6, 1935; Toronto, Ontario, Canada
- Died: January 27, 2015 (aged 80); Toronto, Ontario
- Education: University of Western Ontario; University of Toronto
- Occupations: Canadian businessman and philanthropist
- Spouse: Sandra Frieberg
- Children: Janis, Kenneth

Joseph Louis Rotman OC MSC (January 6, 1935 – January 27, 2015) was a Canadian businessman and philanthropist. Rotman was the founder, benefactor and member of organizations such as the Clairvest Group Inc., Rotman Institute of Philosophy, Rotman Research Institute, and Rotman School of Management.

Throughout his life, he received three honorary degrees, as well as an induction into the Canadian Business Hall of Fame. He is well-regarded for donating his time and financial assistance to numerous philanthropic causes including the arts, education and healthcare.

== Early life and family ==
Joseph Rotman was born in Toronto, Ontario, in 1935. He attended the University of Western Ontario after which he continued on to the University of Toronto to obtain his MComm from the Institute of Business Administration in 1960.

He was married to Sandra Frieberg from 1959 until his death; they had two children: Janis and Kenneth.

== Business career ==
Rotman began his business career in 1962 and had been involved in establishing a number of private and public companies active in oil trading, petroleum distribution, oil and gas exploration, merchant banking, real estate, and venture capital. In 1987, he founded Clairvest Group Inc., a Canadian-based company, which provides merchant banking for emerging companies and is listed on the Toronto Stock Exchange.

Joseph was also the chairman of Roy-L Capital Corporation, a private family investment company. He served on corporate boards including those of Bank of Montreal, Barrick Gold, Canada Northwest Energy Ltd. (subsequently acquired by Sherritt International), Masonite International, and TrizecHahn Corporation. He was involved as a founder of Tarragon Oil and Gas, Geocrude Energy, PanCana Resources, PanCana Minerals and Embassy Resources, as well as a number of other companies.

== Supporter of the arts ==
Rotman served as chair of the board of the Art Gallery of Ontario (1993–96), as a board member (1991–2000) and continued, along with his wife, to be a benefactor. During this time, he was also a member of the board of the Governor General's Performing Arts Awards (1996–1998).

In July 2008, Rotman was appointed to a five-year term as chair of the Canada Council for the Arts, the national arts funding agency that provides grants, endowments, prizes and promotion of the arts. He was re-elected as chair in July 2013 for an additional 5 years.

== Education benefactor ==
The Rotmans established involvement with the University of Toronto in 1981. From 2001 to 2004, Rotman sat on the Committee for Honorary Degrees, was a governing council member from 1995 to 2003, an executive committee member (1998–2003) and was the vice-chair of the University of Toronto's Asset Management Corporation (2000–2006).

The Rotman School of Management was named in his honour by his wife as an internationally renowned business education institution that educates globally competitive leaders. The Rotmans also provided financial assistance for the Lloyd and Delphine Martin Prosperity Institute.

The Rotmans also supported Western University since 1999 through the Rotman Institute of Philosophy – Engaging Science, which fosters a global centre to build novel and productive bridges between humanities and the sciences to address relevant issues faced by society. In addition, Rotman established the Rotman Canada Research Chair in Philosophy of Science addressing the nature of scientific theory.

== Life sciences and innovation ==
Rotman lent his business experience to the advancement of Canadian life sciences research, Canadian innovation and commercialization capacity, and related public policy at both the federal and provincial levels, including the Canadian Institutes of Health Research (CIHR), and Chair of the Ontario Genomics Institute, a provincial entity, for Genome Canada.

In 1989, the Rotman Research Institute was established to gain knowledge in cognitive neuroscience. Since 1990, his wife's financial contributions have assisted the University Health Network at the University of Toronto in founding the Sandra Rotman Centre for Global Health along with the Sandra Rotman Chair in Health Sector Strategy.

He was also a founder and was a member of the board of directors of MaRS (Medical and Related Sciences) Discovery District.

Rotman began co-leading the development of a major review and study of the state of brain research in Ontario and Canada in 2008. The review covered recommendations to transform brain research as well as its translation and commercialization in Ontario. This included the creation of the Ontario Brain Institute with a focus on optimizing the health, economic and societal impacts from brain research in Ontario and Canada. As a result, he served as the chair of the board of directors with the institute, a virtual research centre helping Ontario to build on its global neuroscience achievements by turning health care discoveries into products and services to help people affected by brain diseases and disorders.

Another significant appointment for Rotman was Chairman of Grand Challenges Canada, a not-for-profit organization dedicated to improving the health and well-being of people in developing countries by integrating scientific, technological, business and social innovation both in Canada and in the developing world. Grand Challenges Canada was originally funded by the federal government's Development Innovation Fund announced in the 2008 budget, working in a consortium with the International Development Research Centre, and the Canadian Institutes of Health Research.

He chaired both the Ontario BioCouncil Report for the Ontario government and the Expert Panel on Commercialization, called People and Excellence, a report for Industry Canada on commercialization.

Other boards and committees that Rotman has served on include: Gairdner Foundation International, Global Network of Science Academies and Royal Societies Development Advisory Committee, Ontario Genomics Institute, StemCell Network, and the Baycrest Centre for Geriatric Care.

== Awards and honours ==
In 1994, Rotman was awarded an honorary LLD from the University of Toronto. Less than a year later, his appointment as an Officer of the Order of Canada was announced, and he was invested on March 1, 1995.

In 2009, Rotman was awarded his second honorary LLD, from Western University, and he was also inducted into the Canadian Business Hall of Fame as a Companion and honoured, along with his wife Sandra, with the Outstanding Philanthropists Award by The Association of Fundraising Professionals.

On November 21, 2011, Rotman was named the twenty-first Chancellor of his alma mater, Western University. His four-year term began on July 1, 2012.

On February 29, 2012, Rotman was presented with the Lifetime Achievement Award from Life Sciences Ontario. On October 10, 2012, Rotman was presented with the Entrepreneur of the Year 2012 Ontario Lifetime Achievement Award from Ernst & Young.

In 2013, Rotman was awarded an honorary LLD from Memorial University.

At a ceremony at Rideau Hall on November 18, 2015, the Governor General posthumously awarded the Meritorious Service Cross to Rotman, and the decoration was presented to his widow, Sandra.

== Other achievements ==
In recognition of a lifetime of success and philanthropy, Rotman and his wife were selected as torchbearers for the Vancouver 2010 Olympic Torch Run on YouTube in Toronto on December 17, 2009.

Rotman and his wife were also awarded the Beth Sholom Brotherhood Humanitarian award in 2010. Rotman was the Honouree of The Toronto Club's 2011 Annual Members Dinner. He was active with many other local, national and international organizations.

== Death ==
Rotman died on January 27, 2015, at Toronto General Hospital, and he was interred at Mount Pleasant Cemetery, Toronto.

Academic offices
Preceded by John M. Thompson	Chancellor of the University of Western Ontario; 2012–2015	Succeeded by Jack Cowin
