= Tiff Macklem =

10th governor of the Bank of Canada, appointed 2020

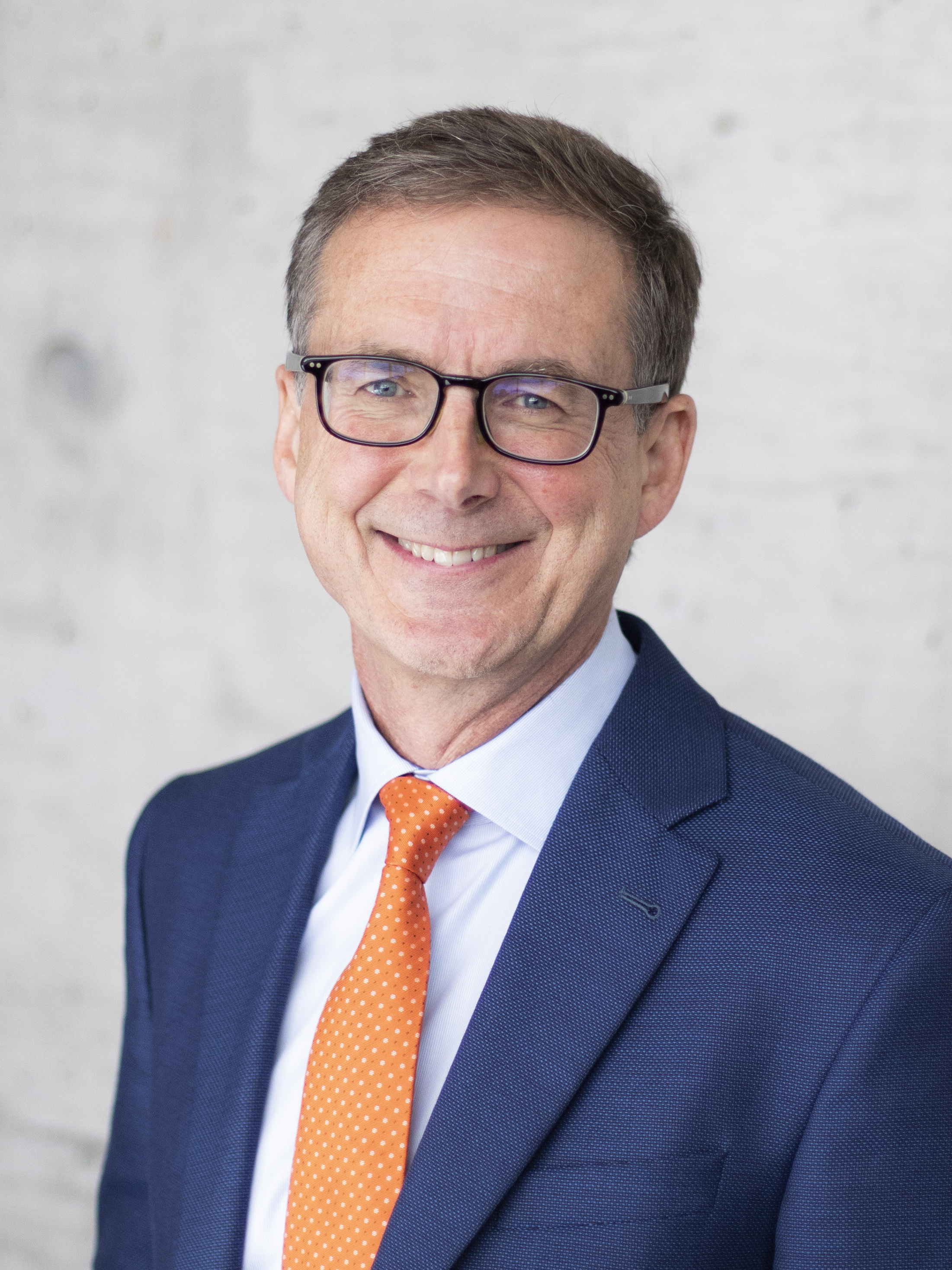
- Macklem in 2018

10th Governor of the Bank of Canada
- Incumbent
- Assumed office June 3, 2020
- Preceded by: Stephen Poloz

Dean of the Rotman School of Management
- In office July 3, 2014 – June 2, 2020
- Preceded by: Peter Pauly (acting); Roger Martin
- Succeeded by: Kenneth Corts (acting); Susan Christoffersen

Personal details
- Born: Richard Tiffany Macklem; June 4, 1961 (age 65) Montreal, Quebec, Canada
- Spouse: Rosemary Macklem
- Relatives: Peter Macklem (uncle)
- Education: Queen's University (BA); University of Western Ontario (MA, PhD)

Richard Tiffany "Tiff" Macklem (born June 4, 1961) is a Canadian central banker and economist who has served as the 10th governor of the Bank of Canada since 2020.

He served as the dean of the Rotman School of Management from 2014 to 2020. He began his public sector career at the Bank of Canada as senior deputy governor from 2010 to 2014 under Mark Carney.

== Early life and education ==
Richard Tiffany Macklem was born on June 4, 1961, in Montreal, Quebec, to Dick and Janet (Gray-Donald) Macklem. His father was the chief financial officer of Birks. His uncle, Peter Macklem, was an accomplished academic physician and researcher. He grew up in Westmount, where he attended Selwyn House School from grades 5 to 11. Instead of attending CEGEP afterwards, he completed one year of pre-university at Lower Canada College.

He graduated from Queen's University in 1983 with a bachelor's degree in economics, and completed a master's degree and a PhD in economics from the University of Western Ontario in 1989.

== Career ==
Macklem joined the Bank of Canada in 1984. He worked in the Department of Monetary and Financial Analysis for one year. He returned to the Bank of Canada in 1989 following the completion of his graduate studies. He occupied increasingly senior positions in the Research Department (now Canadian Economic Analysis) until his appointment as Chief in January 2000.

Macklem was appointed Adviser to the Governor in August 2003. In 2003–4, he was seconded to the Department of Finance, returning to the Bank of Canada as a Deputy Governor in December 2004. He rejoined the Department of Finance as Associate Deputy Minister in 2007, in which he served until June 30, 2010.

=== Senior Deputy Governor ===
Macklem was appointed Senior Deputy Governor for a term of seven years beginning July 1, 2010. In this position, Macklem was the Bank of Canada's chief operating officer and a member of its board of directors.

Macklem was also responsible for overseeing strategic planning and coordinating of the Bank of Canada's operations, sharing responsibility for the conduct of monetary policy as a member of the Bank of Canada's governing council, and participating in fulfilling the Bank of Canada's responsibilities for promoting financial stability. Macklem also chaired the Standing Committee on Standards Implementation at the Financial Stability Board.

As the senior deputy governor and number two at the Bank of Canada, Macklem was widely expected to succeed as BOC Governor with the appointment of Mark Carney as Governor of the Bank of England. Macklem was passed over in favour of Stephen Poloz, becoming the third senior deputy governor in a row, after Malcolm Knight and Paul Jenkins, not to be chosen as the governor of the BOC. Macklem was considered a successor to former BOC Governor David Dodge and widely respected in the BOC and worldwide, although as a career civil servant he lacked the private sector experience that Carney and Poloz possessed. An editorial in the Vancouver Sun suggested that Macklem would soon leave the BOC after being snubbed twice for the top position.

Although Macklem's term would have run until 2017, he announced his resignation to take effect on May 1, 2014, to become the dean of the Rotman School of Management at the University of Toronto. Paul Ferley, assistant chief economist at Royal Bank of Canada, suggested of Macklem's departure "It's a real loss for the bank, that you lose that human capital" as Carney and Macklem formed the tandem that had guided Canada through the late-2000s financial recession.

Macklem was a member of Scotiabank's board of directors from June 2015 until his appointment as Bank of Canada Governor in 2020.

=== Bank of Canada Governor ===
On May 1, 2020, Macklem was named as the 10th governor of the Bank of Canada, succeeding Stephen Poloz. He assumed the office on June 3.

During his tenure, Macklem confronted the post-COVID-19 pandemic inflation surge. Under Macklem, the bank raised its key interest rate seven consecutive times in 2022, rising from 0.25% in March to 4.25% in December.

In 2024, the bank cut its key interest rate five consecutive times, lowering it from 5% in June to 3.25% in December. Macklem said further reductions would be considered one decision at a time.
