= Roger Martin (professor) =

Canadian professor and author

Roger Martin CM
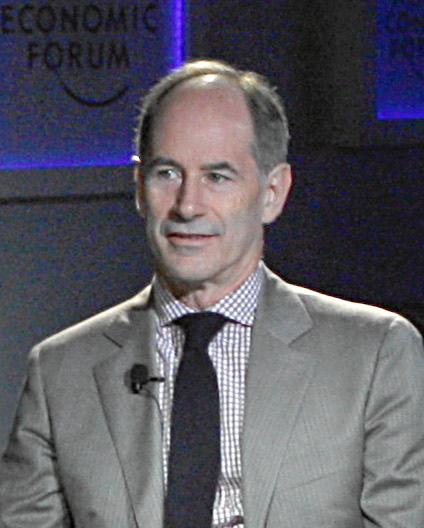

Dean of the Rotman School of Management
- In office 1998 – 2013
- Preceded by: Hugh J. Arnold; Paul J. Halpern (interim)
- Succeeded by: Peter Pauly (interim); Tiff Macklem

Personal details
- Born: 4 August 1956 (age 70) Wallenstein, Ontario, Canada
- Occupations: Professor, non-fiction writer

Academic background
- Education: Harvard University (AB 1979, MBA 1981)

Academic work
- Discipline: Behavioral finance
- Institutions: University of Toronto Rotman School of Management
- Notable works: The Opposable Mind, The Design of Business, Fixing the Game

Roger L. Martin CM (born 4 August 1956) is the former dean of the Rotman School of Management at the University of Toronto from 1998 to 2013 and an author of several business books. Martin has expanded several important business concepts in use today, including integrative thinking. He has been recognized by several business publications as one of the field's most important thinkers.

== Career ==
At Harvard College, Martin represented the Harvard Crimson playing for the Harvard Crimson men's volleyball.

Martin began his career at Monitor Group, the global management consulting firm based in Cambridge, Massachusetts. He spent 13 years at Monitor, becoming a director, founding their Canadian office and their educational arm, Monitor University. He served as the co-head of the firm for two years.

Martin was appointed dean of the Rotman School of Management in September 1998. He started his third term as dean in May 2011 but he announced his resignation a year early, to take effect in June 2013.

After he stepped down as dean of Rotman, he took up a leadership position at the Martin Prosperity Institute, where he will focus his research on the future of democratic capitalism.

Martin currently served on several boards, including Thomson Reuters Corporation, the Skoll Foundation and Tennis Canada. He was previously a director of BlackBerry Ltd (formerly Research In Motion Limited (RIM)) from 2007 until November 25, 2013.

== Writing and business experience ==
Martin is a regular columnist for Businessweek's Innovation and Design Channel, the Washington Post’s On Leadership blog and the Financial Times’ Judgement Call column. He has written fifteen Harvard Business Review articles.

He has focused much of his recent work and research on integrative thinking, business design and most recently corporate responsibility and more broadly the role of the corporation in our society. He has written and co-authored more than twelve books, some include The Responsibility Virus (2003), The Opposable Mind (2007), The Design of Business (2009), and Fixing the Game (2011) and has co-authored books with Mihnea Moldoveanu, The Future of the MBA (2008) and Diaminds (2009), James Milway, Canada: What It Is, What It Can Be (2012), and A.G. Lafley, former CEO of Procter & Gamble, Playing to Win (2013). His latest book is A New Way to Think: Your Guide to Superior Managerial Effectiveness (Harvard Business Review Press, 2022)

In 2019, Thinkers50 ranked him the second most influential management thinker in the world. In 2017, he was ranked number one.

== Business ideas ==
Martin's two largest intellectual contributions to the business community have come from his work in integrative thinking and design thinking, both theories that he has helped to originate and develop.

Integrative thinking is the ability to balance two opposing models, and instead of choosing one at the expense of the other, generating a creative solution that contains elements of the individual models, but is superior to each. Martin argues that business leaders that master this mode of thinking have a unique ability to innovate and solve problems facing their company.

Design Thinking balances analytical thinking and intuitive thinking, enabling an organization to both exploit existing knowledge and create new knowledge. A design-thinking organization is capable of effectively advancing knowledge from mystery to heuristic to algorithm. The design-thinking organization is capable of achieving lasting and regenerating competitive advantage.

Both modes of thinking have become more prevalent in the business community in recent years with companies including Procter & Gamble, Four Seasons, and Research in Motion incorporating both design and integrative thinking into their business strategies.

In 2004, Martin collaborated with then-Conservative Party leadership candidate Tony Clement on a proposal for a lifetime income tax to reform Canada's taxation system.

Martin's most recent work has centered around corporate responsibility and the company's role within our economic structure. He has argued for an overhaul in how we evaluate the success of companies, advocating a shift in focus from the stock market. He proposes several suggestions including an alteration in the current executive compensation models, and a renewed strategic focus aimed at benefiting customers and the community. In one of his recent books, Fixing the Game, Martin notes that "the problem isn’t that Wall Street broke the rules to their own benefit, it’s that the rules themselves are unhelpful”, and suggests that the best solution is to eliminate short-term stock-based compensation.

In 2021, Thinkers50 ranked him the fifth most influential management thinker in the world. In 2017, he was ranked number one.

== Personal life ==
In October 2015, Martin married fellow dual US & Canadian citizen Marie-Louise Skafte. In 2016, Martin was appointed to the Order of Canada as a member. Martin is also a long time fan of the New England Patriots football team.
