= Rotman School of Management =

Business school of the University of Toronto

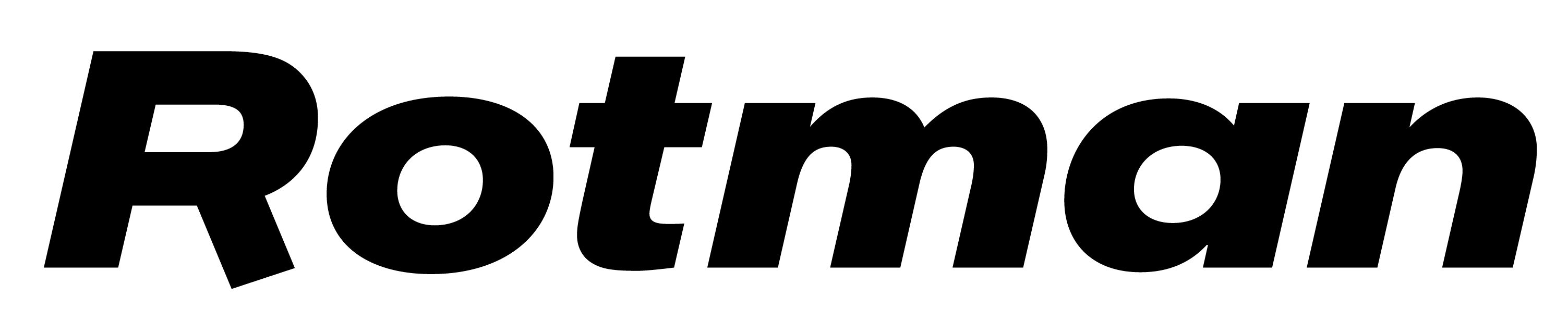
- Other name: Joseph L. Rotman School of Management
- Former names: Faculty of Management Studies (1972–1986); Faculty of Management (1986–1997)
- Type: Public business school
- Established: 1972; 54 years ago
- Parent institution: University of Toronto
- Accreditation: AACSB
- Dean: Susan Christoffersen
- Faculty: 125 full-time faculty
- Undergraduates: 3,292 (Rotman Commerce)
- Postgraduates: 846
- Doctoral students: 350
- Location: Toronto, Ontario, Canada; 43°39′55″N 79°23′54″W
- Named for: Joseph L. Rotman
Colours
Process magenta and black
- Website: rotman.utoronto.ca

The Joseph L. Rotman School of Management (commonly known as the Rotman School of Management or simply Rotman) is the graduate business school of the University of Toronto, based on the St. George campus in downtown Toronto, Ontario, Canada. The university has offered undergraduate courses in commerce and management since 1901, however the business school was formally established in 1950. The school is named after Joseph L. Rotman, its principal benefactor.

The school offers undergraduate, graduate and doctoral programs in business administration, finance and commerce, including full-time, part-time and executive MBA programs along with a Master of Finance program, a Master of Management, a Master of Management Analytics, the Master of Financial Risk Management, a Graduate Diploma in Professional Accounting, and a doctoral program. Its PhD in management program is offered tri-campus, on the St. George, Mississauga, and Scarborough campuses.

Additionally, in collaboration with other divisions at the university and abroad, it offers combined or joint MBA degrees with the Henry N.R. Jackman Faculty of Law (JD/MBA), the Faculty of Applied Science and Engineering (Skoll BASc/MBA), the Leslie Dan Faculty of Pharmacy (PharmD/MBA), the Munk School of Global Affairs and Public Policy (MBA/MGA), the Temerty Faculty of Medicine (MD/MBA); and Collaborative Programs in Asia-Pacific Studies and Environmental Studies.

== History ==
=== Predecessors and early history (1901–1972) ===
The programs for which the Rotman School of Management is now responsible had their origins in 1901 when a diploma program in commerce was inaugurated in the Faculty of Arts. This was transformed into a Bachelor of Arts program in Commerce and Finance in 1909 and into a Bachelor of Commerce program in 1920. These programs had a strong liberal arts emphasis which the BCom program still tries to retain. A Master of Commerce program was started in the Faculty of Arts in 1938 to provide a more professional program.

In 1950 the MCom program was transferred into the newly created Institute of Business Administration with a Director as its head. The degree was changed to Master of Business Administration in 1960 and the institute was renamed the School of Business.

A Doctor of Philosophy program was begun in 1969 to develop its research orientation and to provide business school faculty for Canadian universities.

=== Faculty of Management Studies (1972–1995) ===
The school in its current form was officially established as the Faculty of Management Studies in 1972, with John Crispo as its first dean.

In 1982 the School assumed responsibility for teaching the Commerce courses within the BCom program and in 1992 the BCom program became a joint program of the Faculty of Arts and Science and of the Rotman School. In 1983 the School began a privately financed Executive MBA program. It was renamed again, being shortened to the Faculty of Management in 1986. In 1989 a privately funded MBA in professional accounting was added. In 1996 it was moved to the University of Toronto's Mississauga campus and the degree changed to Master of Management & Professional Accounting, now offered by the Institute for Management and Innovation (IMI). The School also offers a variety of non-degree Executive Development Programs and operates a number of research centres which complement its teaching and research activities.

=== Present name (1995–present) ===
In 1995, the Joseph L. Rotman Centre for Management, funded in part by a $3 million donation made by Joseph Rotman in 1993, was opened and the Faculty of Management shifted its base to its current building after previously moving locations multiple times. The centre was later expanded with additions to the upper floors along with a new South Building, with the original building now known as the North Building. The school was renamed as the Joseph L. Rotman School of Management in 1997, in honour of a $15 million donation of its principal benefactor, Joseph Rotman, to be paid out over a period of time ending in 2011.

Rotman's donation was particularly controversial, as examined in a 1997 cover story of The Varsity. The donor agreement included several clauses that could limit the university and faculty of management's academic freedom. The agreement required that "U of T [rank] the faculty of management as one of its 'highest priorities' for the allocation of university funding, ensuring to its 'best efforts' that business education receives continuing focus." Bill Graham, then-president of the University of Toronto Faculty Association, was among the most vocal opponents of the original agreement, noted "the unqualified support for the 'vision,' and it talked about non-qualified support for and commitment to the values and principles underlying the 'vision' by the members of the faculty of management, as well as the central administration". The donation agreement underwent some substantial revisions, but the Rotman Foundation retained the right to "bring in an outside expert from the Association of American Universities to recommend policy changes if it was felt that the school of management was failing to live up to the criteria set out in the agreement". The school, however, retains its status as a Faculty in the University of Toronto.

In 1998, former management consultant Roger Martin was appointed Dean of the School, and during his tenure he oversaw the changes mandated by the Rotman Foundation. Martin's high profile and outspokenness caused some conflict with the other University faculties, notwithstanding, he was credited with "[transforming] what was a small, rather inconsequential regional player in Canada into a world-class institution offering a more differentiated MBA program focused around integrative thinking, self-development and business design".

In the year 2000, Marcel Desautels, founder, president and CEO of the Canadian Credit Management Foundation helped in creating Marcel Desautels Centre for Integrative Thinking with a $10-million gift. Rotman developed a new model of business education based on integrative thinking in the same year. The Michael Lee-Chin Family Institute for Corporate Citizenship (originally the AIC Institute for Corporate Citizenship) was established at Rotman in 2004 with a $10-million gift from Michael Lee-Chin. The same year, Rotman completed an expansion of its campus. In recent years, the school has received significant funding from private and public quarters.

In 2011, Rotman's academic expenditures were $71 million for 1,500 students (the Faculty of Architecture spent $7 million for 400 students), comparable to that of the University of Toronto Scarborough campus. Part of those costs were attributed to the high salaries paid to faculty, as six of the top 10 salaries paid to University of Toronto employees for 2012 went to Rotman professors and administrators, according to the Ontario Ministry of Finance Public Sector Salary Disclosure ("sunshine list"). Roger Martin, the longtime dean of the school, argued that "It's extremely expensive to have a good business school. So the salaries are higher; in order to get world-class faculty you have to pay those salaries. Student services are greater". The Financial Times showed that Rotman graduates saw an average salary increase of slightly over 100 percent after finishing their degrees.

Under Roger Martin's leadership, Rotman saw dramatic growth in the size of its programs, faculty, facilities and international reputation. New programs launched included the Morning MBA program, Master of Finance program and a Global Executive MBA program. In September 2012, a new building expansion was opened, more than doubling the amount of teaching, research, study, presentation and special event space.

Becoming the Dean of the Rotman School in 2014, Tiff Macklem launched of a number of specialized graduate management programs at the School, in financial risk management, professional accounting, management analytics and healthcare. He championed diversity and inclusion, experiential learning and entrepreneurship initiatives, such as the Creative Destruction Lab. A prominent expert on sustainable finance, risk management and public policy, he left Rotman to become governor of the Bank of Canada in June 2020.

Susan Christoffersen began a five-year term as Dean on July 1, 2021. A finance professor at Rotman since 2010, she has also served as Vice-Dean, Undergraduate and Specialized Programs from 2015- 2020 and was known as a curriculum innovator. In 2022, she launched Purpose into Action: Academic Plan 2022-2027 followed by an ambitious new fundraising goal of $250 million as part the University of Toronto's Defy Gravity campaign. In 2025, she led the School in launching two new degree programs, a One-Year Advanced MBA and a Master of Management.

== Academics ==
All units for management education at the University of Toronto, including Rotman, are accredited by the Association to Advance Collegiate Schools of Business (AACSB).

=== Graduate programs ===
The Rotman School delivers the MBA program in six formats; full-time Two-Year MBA, part-time three-year Morning MBA, part-time three-year Evening MBA, one year Executive MBA that is designed for senior managers, the Rotman-SDA Bocconi Global Executive MBA, which is delivered in eight key centres of international business in six countries, and a Global Executive MBA for Healthcare and the Life Sciences. The school also offers a Master of Finance program, a Master of Financial Risk Management, a Master of Management Analytics and a Graduate Diploma in Professional Accounting.

==== Rotman Full-Time MBA ====
The full-time MBA program is a two-year program. The school offers optional pre-courses in accounting, finance and quantitative methods, and professional skills workshops on topics such as academic writing and presentation skills. The first year begins in the second week of September and is divided into four quarters, covering the program's core curriculum and lasting seven weeks each. The first year curriculum consists of a 4-weeks foundation term, followed by two 9-weeks core term, and finishing with a 6-weeks capstone term. In the second year, the students are required to complete, over the time of three terms, 10 elective courses out of 90 courses.

The school offers the MBA degree with emphases in brand management, consulting, funds management, global management, health sector management, human resources management, Innovation and entrepreneurship, Investment banking, and risk management and financial engineering. The student can major with one or more specialization depending on the elective courses taken in the second year.

The students can spend an entire term in second year on an international exchange program. Study tours to various parts of the world are also conducted for second year students. Students can also participate in the flexible internship program at any time after the first year during the summer, fall, or winter terms.

The full-time MBA program annual class expanded in size in recent years, to 278 students in the graduating class of 2023. International students constitute 58% of the Full-Time MBA class and 45% of the class are female. The students of the 2023 class represented 39 countries though the majority of students were from North America and Asia. The average age of the full-time MBA students at the start of the program is 28 years and the students have 5 years of work experience on average.

The Rotman Full-Time MBA tuition fees, for the class of 2023 have been increased to $92,540 for Canadian citizens and Permanent Residents, and to $133,740 for international students, making it the most expensive MBA program in Canada.

==== Rotman One-Year MBA ====
Announced in 2025, the One-Year MBA program is an accelerated degree, designed for those with an existing academic and professional background in business and management. The program allows qualified 70 students each year to complete the Full-Time MBA program over three terms. Students in the option engage in a reduced core curriculum prior to completing a set of electives. The One-Year MBA began recruiting in the summer of 2025, with the first cohort starting classes in May 2026.

==== Rotman Master of Management ====
The Master of Management is an 11-month program that will welcome its first cohort of 70 students in May 2026. The program is intended high-achieving students who possess deep learning in a non-business discipline with the skills of business and management. The aim is to provide graduates to gain the skills and knowledge they need to launch their careers in business and in industries including finance, consulting, marketing, technology, operations, healthcare and retail.

==== Rotman Evening MBA ====
The Rotman Evening MBA programs is a part-time MBA designed for working professionals who want to pursue a graduate degree while maintaining their career momentum. The program takes place 32 months.

Students also complete three one-week-long sessions at various points in the first two years. Electives, offered in the second and third year, may be taken in the morning, evening or during regular working hours (depending on availability).

==== Rotman Master of Finance ====
Launched in 2006, the Master of Finance program is designed for working professionals in the finance field. Classes are held one evening per week plus every other Saturday over a 20-month period. The program offers content that is deeper and broader than that provided by a CFA or other professional finance programs.

==== Rotman Executive MBA programs ====
The Rotman Executive MBA (EMBA) is an intensive, 13-month program aims for professionals. It allows business leaders to earn a degree without interrupting their careers.

Offered over 18 months, the Rotman-SDA Bocconi Global Executive MBA program immerses mid-to-senior executives in core business disciplines from a global perspective. The program, supported by well-known post-secondary institutions in Brazil, India, Hong Kong and China, brings participants together in cross-cultural study teams to gain business experience in the world's main economic regions.

Launched in September 2019, the Global Executive MBA for Healthcare and the Life Sciences is an 18-month program that brings professionals to three key healthcare clusters around the world: Toronto, the Bay area and Singapore. Candidates are mid-to-senior level professionals from industry, providers and service delivery organizations, consulting firms, public agencies, science, and payers in the healthcare and life sciences sector around the world who seek to advance their leadership careers.

==== Other programs ====
The Master of Financial Risk Management program prepares students with strong analytic and quantitative skills for careers in the finance industry. The 10-month program includes a 2-month risk management project, which partners students to work with risk management professionals to tackle a real issue of interest to financial institutions.

The Graduate Diploma in Professional Accounting is a 12-week summer program that deepens the' knowledge of accounting while satisfying four modules of the CPA Professional Education Program (CPA PEP). The program prepares students for the Common Final Examination (CFE) and allows them to advance straight to the Capstone 1 module in the CPA PEP. Students with employment offers from an accounting firm before or after starting the GDipPA should inquire with their employer about potential tuition subsidies.

Offered over 11 months, the Master of Management Analytics (MMA) program is designed to give students advanced analytics skills required to shape business decisions, as well as exposure to newest predictive tools in machine learning and artificial intelligence.

The JD/MBA program is a four-year degree offered by the Rotman School and the University of Toronto's Faculty of Law. This program combines graduate training in management with a degree in law. Taken separately, these two degrees would take five years to complete.

The Jeffrey Skoll BASc/MBA program brings together undergraduate studies in engineering and an MBA. It is oriented towards careers in technology-based businesses.

The PharmD/MBA is a five-year degree offered in partnership with the Leslie Dan Faculty of Pharmacy and aims to pharmacists with the business skills needed to become leaders in the industry.

The MBA/MGA is a joint program with the Munk School of Global Affairs and Public Policy and offers students with an opportunity to integrate an international approach and perspective into their study of business and bring a business perspective to the study of global affairs.

The MDA/MBA is a five-year combined degree program offered in partnership with the Temerty Faculty of Medicine and is designed to provide a select group of medical students with the leadership skills to address the innovations transforming the healthcare and life sciences, an $8-trillion global industry.

The Master of Financial Economics program is offered jointly with the Department of Economics. It includes a two semesters of coursework, a summer internship, followed by one more semester of classes.

The Collaborative Program in Asia-Pacific Studies is a collaborative master's degree program, taken alongside the MBA program. It provides advanced training in the historical and social science studies of modern East and Southeast Asia.

Students admitted to the MBA program can apply to the Collaborative Program in Environmental Studies, a collaborative program offered through the University of Toronto's Centre for Environment.

=== Doctoral programs ===
The PhD program offers degrees in accounting, economic analysis and policy, finance, marketing, operations management, organizational behaviour & human resource management, and strategic management. Also, a joint degree in management and economics is offered (Master in Financial Economics). Its PhD in management program is operated under the University of Toronto's tri-campus framework, and offered on all three of its campuses: St. George, Mississauga, and Scarborough.

=== Rankings and reputation ===
Business school rankings

Global
- QS MBA: 55
- Financial Times MBA: 81

In the 2026 QS Global MBA Rankings, Rotman was ranked 55th of business schools globally and first in Canada.

In the 2026 Financial Times rankings of MBA programs, Rotman ranked 81st in the world and second in Canada after Ivey Business School. In the 2025 Financial Times Executive MBA programs ranking, Rotman ranked 47th globally.

== Research institutes and education centres ==
=== Behavioural Economics in Action at Rotman (BEAR) ===
One of the leading research institutes at the Rotman School, Behavioural Economics in Action at Rotman (BEAR) conducts leading edge academic research in the field of behavioural economics to help organizations better understand how real people act and in turn, design better products, services, and programs for them. The centre combines decades of research in decision-making with empirically tested tools to facilitate behavioural change. The researchers associated with the centre look at social and economic problems from a behavioural science lens and design solutions that go beyond the traditional approaches of applying incentives, penalties or provisioning information.

View a complete list of the research institutes and education centres at the Rotman School.

=== Capital Markets Institute ===
The Capital Markets Institute at the Rotman School of Management works towards fostering a clear understanding of the challenges facing the Canadian capital markets, and the institutional tools that Canada must develop in order to convert those challenges into opportunities to be a leader among the world's small, open capital markets. The CMI seeks to provide leadership to the Canadian academic and business communities to channel their resources into meaningful policy improvements. The institute provides scholarships to students who wish to pursue research in the area of the capital markets in conjunction with their graduate studies in Law or Finance.

=== Creative Destruction Lab at Rotman ===
The Creative Destruction Lab at Rotman is an entrepreneurial program and space within the Rotman School of Management at the University of Toronto. Its purpose is to work with students, faculty, and alumni from the University of Toronto that have the potential to build massively scalable companies. The program runs for eight months of the year and is built around reporting milestones to a board, called the G7 fellows, of very successful entrepreneurs. The founding G7 fellows group includes; Daniel Debow, Dennis Bennie, Dan Shimmerman, Nigel Stokes, Lee Lau, Tomi Poutanen, and Nick Koudas.

=== The David and Sharon Johnston Centre for Corporate Governance Innovation ===
The David and Sharon Johnston Centre for Corporate Governance Innovation is the locus of corporate governance research and communications at the Rotman School of Management. The Centre monitors Canadian corporate governance trends and provides guidance to firms looking to improve their board effectiveness and disclosure. It focuses on CEO compensation disclosure, study of small and medium-sized enterprises' governance, and tracking the governance impact of directors who sit on the boards of four or more TSX Index-listed companies.

=== Institute for Gender and the Economy (GATE) ===
The Institute for Gender and the Economy (GATE) promotes an understanding of gender inequalities and how they can be remedied – by people of all genders – in the world of business and, more broadly, in the economy. Some of the aims of GATE include: investigating the hidden mechanisms that propagate gender equality, funding, translating, and disseminating innovative, academic research, and engaging executives, policy makers, and students to create new solutions for achieving equality, advancing careers, and creating economic prosperity.

=== Sandra Rotman Centre for Health Sector Strategy ===
The Sandra Rotman Centre for Health Sector Strategy was inaugurated in 2004 and is a key area of focused research for the Rotman School. Under the direction of Professor Brian R. Golden and a board of advisors from industry, government and academia, the Centre for Health Sector Strategy drives a research agenda that is aimed at producing actionable management knowledge for the health sector and the life sciences.

Named after philanthropist Sandra Rotman after a gift of $6-million from the Rotman family in 2018, the centre is a leader in research, education and policy making in health care and life science strategy. The central focus of the centre is original research, intended to inform the management and organization of the health sector. A corollary of this focus is the centre's support of knowledge transfer and uptake, through education as well as scholarly and managerial publications.

=== Self-Development Lab ===
The Self-Development Lab is an education centre available to students from across a range of degree programs at the School. The Lab provides students from a range of intensive feedback-based learning activities aimed at developing communicative, interactive and interpersonal skills. Participants gain the opportunity to develop their communicative and interactional skills in a small groups to support their work in the core program, including class presentations, case analysis and group activities.

== Campus ==
Rotman is located in the heart of the University of Toronto's downtown St. George campus. There are several noteworthy features of the building (completed in 1995) that houses the school:

- The Fleck Atrium is a large area on the main (ground) floor which is often used for special events, receptions, and public lectures. It occupies the central area of the building, with an open-air concept that allows individuals on the 2nd and 3rd floors of the building to observe from above. The vaulted ceiling of the atrium is made from glass, creating a brightness throughout the interior space.
- The Milt Harris Library, formerly known as the Business Information Centre, is a branch of the University of Toronto's library system, and supports the students, faculty and staff of the Rotman School and the Rotman Commerce program.
- The BMO Financial Group Financial Research and Trading Lab is a state-of-the-art facility allowing students access to a wide range of financial analysis software packages and data sets. A variety of business competitions are held in the lab throughout the year. In particular the Rotman International Trading Competition (RITC) is an annual trading competition featuring universities from around the world.
- A CAD $4 million expansion of the building, completed in 2005, added about a dozen new faculty/administrative offices and some meeting rooms to each of the 4th and 5th floors of the building.

To accommodate dramatic growth of the program, the school expanded into a new $91.8-million building designed by KPMB Architects which opened in September 2012. The new building, adjacent to and fully integrated with the existing structure, nearly doubles the size of the facilities to provide more space for research and education. The Rotman expansion includes the Desautels Hall, a 400-seat multipurpose space named after lead philanthropist Marcel Desautels. The hall that can be configured in six ways to suit a range of uses from large examinations and guest speaker series to TED talks and alumni events.

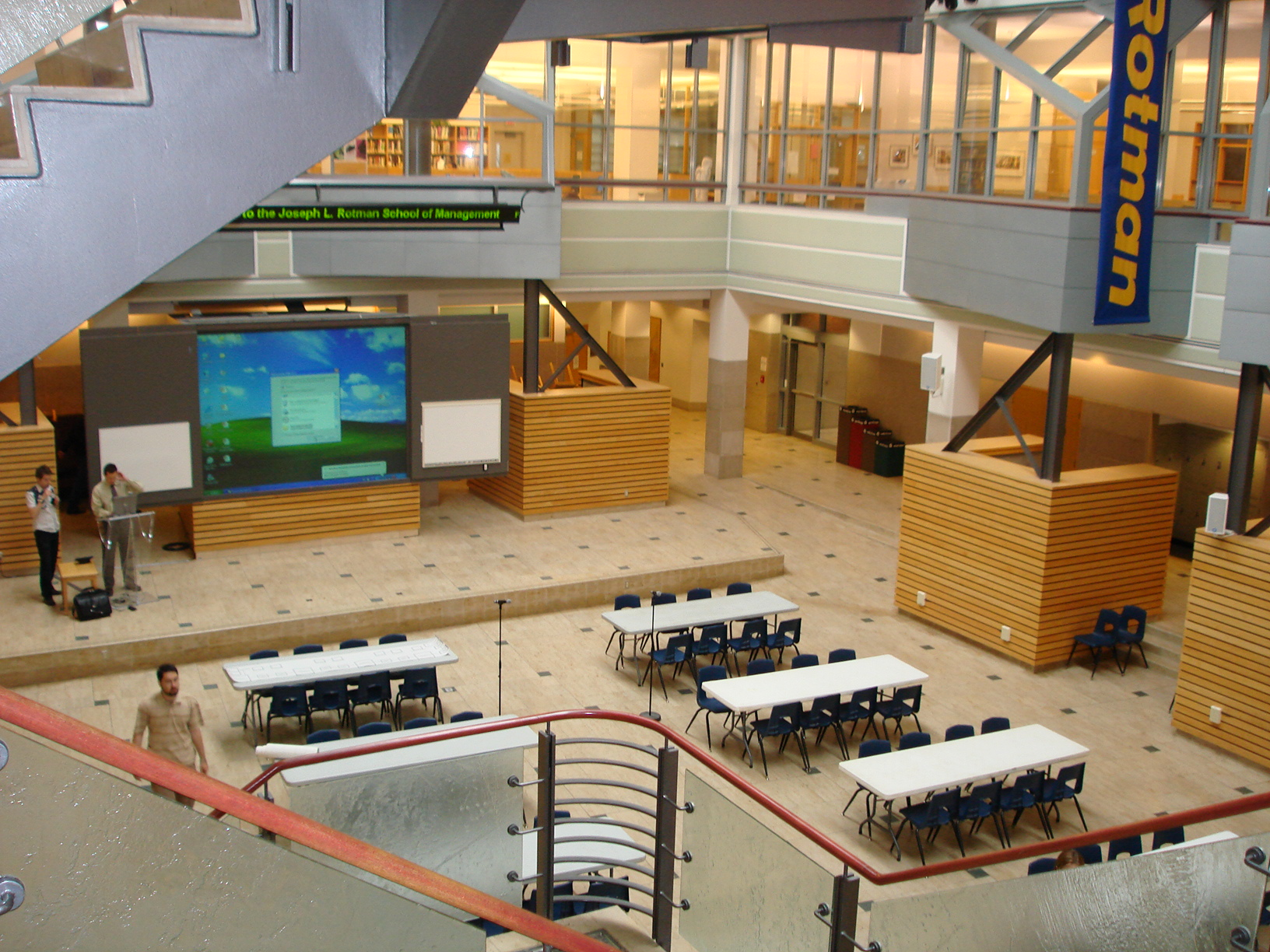
The Fleck Atrium, photo taken from the second floor

== Notable alumni ==
- Jim Balsillie, Retired co-CEO, Research in Motion
- William A. Downe, CEO of the Bank of Montreal from 2007 to 2017
- George R. Gardiner, Financier and Past President, Toronto Stock Exchange; Founder, Gardiner Museum
- Donald Guloien, President and CEO, Manulife Financial Corporation
- Daisy Ho (何超鳳), Chairman of SJM Holdings and executive director of Shun Tak Holdings, daughter of Macau tycoon Stanley Ho (何鴻燊)
- Michael H. Wilson, P.C., C.C., LL.D., Chancellor, University of Toronto; chairman, Barclays Capital Canada Inc.
- Sara Wolfe, Indigenous Canadian nurse, midwife, and healthcare advocate
- Melissa Lantsman, Member of Parliament for Thornhill (2021 - Present) Co-Deputy Leader of His Majesty's Loyal Opposition (2022 - Present)

== List of deans ==
Below is a list of deans of the Rotman School of Management.

- John Crispo (1972–1975)
- Roger Wolff (1985–1992)
- Paul J. Halpern (interim; 1991–1993; 1997–1998)
- Hugh J. Arnold (1992–1997)
- Roger L. Martin (1998–2013)
- Peter Pauly (interim; 2013–2014)
- Tiff Macklem (2014–2020)
- Kenneth Corts (interim; 2020–2021)
- Susan Christoffersen (2021–present)

== See also ==
- List of business schools in Canada
