= Victoria Hale =

American chemist

- Education: University of California, San Francisco
- Awards: MacArthur Fellow
- Scientific career
- Workplaces: Food and Drug Administration (United States); Genentech; The Institute for OneWorld Health

Victoria Hale founded the nonprofit pharmaceutical company The Institute for OneWorld Health in San Francisco, California in 2000 and was its chairman and CEO until 2008, when she became Chair Emeritus. She then went on to found Medicines360, a nonprofit pharmaceutical company dedicated to developing medicines for women and children, including pregnant women.

== Life ==
Hale earned her B.S. in pharmacy from the University of Maryland in 1983 and her Ph.D. in pharmaceutical chemistry from the UCSF School of Pharmacy in 1990. She is an Adjunct Associate professor in Biopharmaceutical Sciences at UCSF, and an advisor to the World Health Organization (WHO).

Her past affiliations include the U.S. Food and Drug Administration's Center for Drug Evaluation and Research, and Genentech.

== Awards ==
- 2004: One of ten "Outstanding Social Entrepreneurs" by the Schwab Foundation for Social Entrepreneurship
- 2005: The Economist Innovation Award for Social and Economic Innovation
- 2006: MacArthur Fellow
- 2006: Ashoka Fellow
- 2007: One of Glamour Magazine's Women of the Year for her work developing and providing pharmaceutical care to the world's poor
- 2012: Honorary Doctor of Science from the University of Southern California

== Bibliography ==
- Buse, Uwe Die Achse des Guten in der Spiegel nr. 48/27 Nov. 2006 (German language)
