= A.G. Lafley =

American businessman

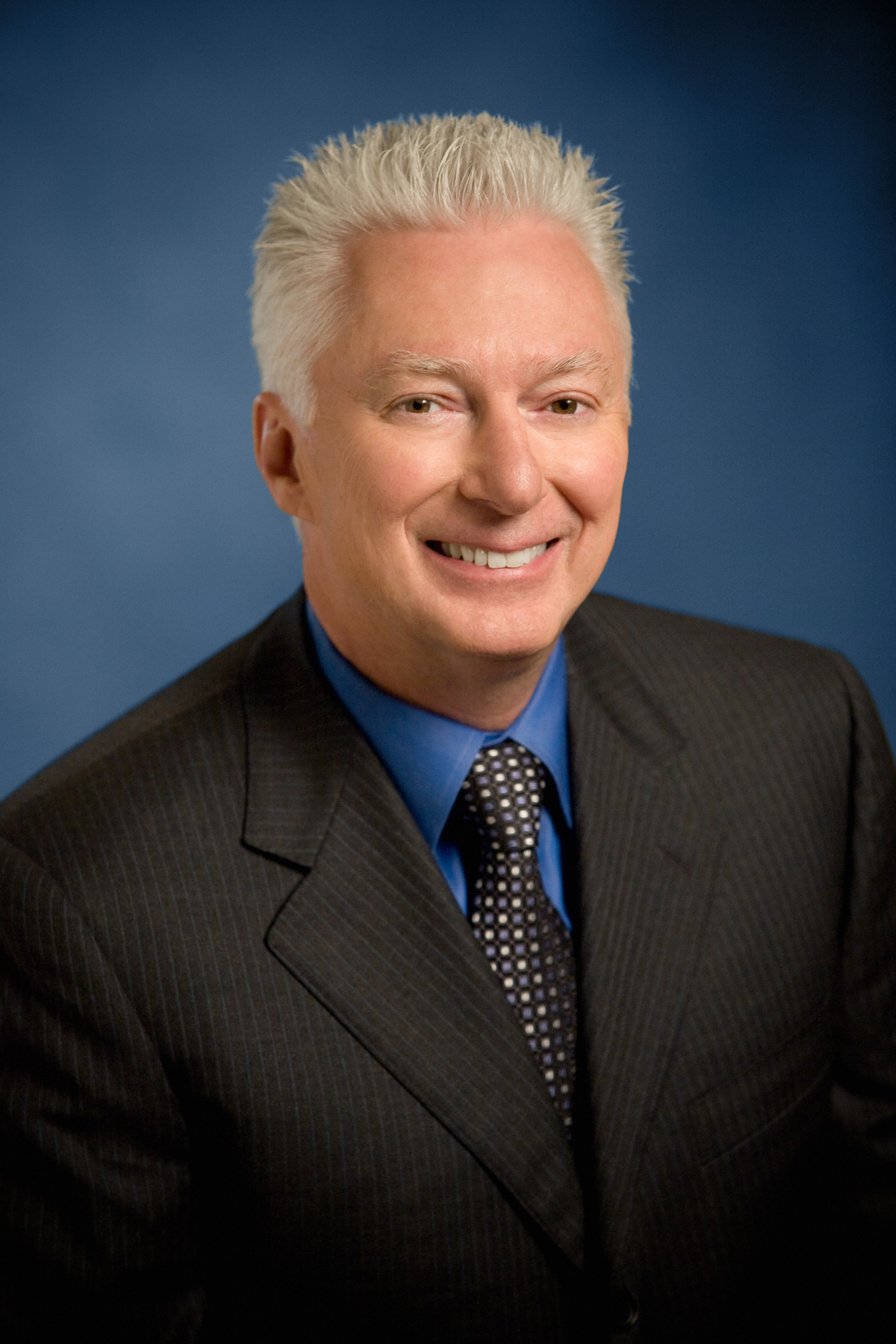
- Born: Alan George Lafley; June 13, 1947 (age 79); Keene, New Hampshire, U.S.
- Education: Hamilton College; Harvard Business School
- Occupations: Executive Chairman, Procter & Gamble

Alan George "A. G." Lafley (born June 13, 1947) is an American businessman who led consumer goods maker Procter & Gamble (P&G) for two separate stints, from 2000 to 2010 and again from 2013 to 2015, during which he served as chairman, president and CEO. In 2015, he stepped down as CEO to become executive chairman of P&G, eventually retiring in June 2016.

As CEO, Lafley was called "one of the most lauded CEOs in history" and is credited with revitalizing P&G under the mantra “Consumer is Boss,” with a focus on billion dollar brands like Crest, Tide, and Pampers. But he also brought in several new brands, like Swiffer and Febreze, by merging P&G's internal resources with outside “open” innovation, referred to as Connect + Develop.

Prior to rejoining P&G in 2013, Lafley consulted on business and innovation strategy, advising on CEO succession and executive leadership development, and coaching experienced, new, and potential CEOs.

== Early years and education ==
Lafley grew up in Keene, New Hampshire. He graduated from Fenwick High School in Oak Park, Illinois, and earned an A.B. from Hamilton College in 1969. In 1970, after beginning a doctoral program at the University of Virginia, he took a commission with the U.S. Navy as a supply officer during the Vietnam War stationed in Japan. Afterwards, he studied at Harvard Business School, receiving his M.B.A. in 1977. He joined P&G upon his graduation.

== Career with P&G ==
Lafley steadily moved up through the ranks, leading some of P&G's laundry and cleaning businesses. He has been attributed to some of P&G's biggest innovations such as Liquid Tide with Bleach.

In 1994, Lafley returned to Japan to head all of P&G's Asian operations. Here he was able to rejuvenate Japanese sales. Furthermore, he helped build P&G's business in China from less than $90 million to nearly $1 billion in sales. In 1999, P&G promoted Lafley to head the fast-growing business as well as all of North American sales, which was its largest single market at the time.

Lafley took a similar leadership path to the P&G boardroom as Durk Jager; learning the soap and laundry businesses, going through Japan, and eventually leading all Asian operations, then returning to the US to lead the beauty business and ultimately North American sales. The Dutch-born Jager became the CEO in 1999, at a time when P&G was in the midst of a massive corporate restructuring that started in September 1998, which did not go well. In June 1999, Jager announced the layoff of 15,000 employees. In January 2000, news leaked that P&G was considering the acquisition of pharmaceutical company Warner–Lambert (which was eventually sold instead to Pfizer a few months later). Still, P&G stock lost about 48 percent of its value in the first three months of 2000. As a result, Jager had the shortest CEO tenure in P&G history, resigning and was quickly replaced with Lafley in June 2000.

With Lafley leading the company for all of the 2000s, P&G P&G had more than doubled sales by the end of the decade doubled sales since the beginning of the decade. During that time, the company's portfolio of billion-dollar brands grew from 10 to 24 (including former brands Folgers and Actonel) and the number of brands with sales between $500 million and $1 billion increased five-fold with Lafley at P&G's helm.

On average, P&G's annual organic sales grew 5%, annual core earnings-per-share grew 12%, and free cash flow productivity averaged 112% a year since 2001. Further, during Lafley's tenure, the Company's market capitalization had more than doubled, making P&G one of the five most valuable companies in the U.S. and among the 10 most valuable companies in the world.

P&G’s strategy at the time was backed largely by Lafley’s focus on modern innovation – not only in branding and product performance, but also in productivity, IT and the supply chain.

Lafley opened P&G to collaboration and innovation from the outside through a program called “connect and develop.” As a result of this commitment to innovation, year after year, P&G introduced more new brands and products, and more established brand product improvements, than their competitors.

== Career outside of P&G ==
From 2003 to 2009, Lafley chaired Cincinnati Center City development, 3CDC, and worked closely with Mayor Charlie Luken, CEO Steve Leeper and collaboratively with other business and community leaders to reimagine and redevelop the downtown core of Cincinnati.

From 2010-2013, Lafley served as a Special Advisor at Clayton, Dubilier and Rice private equity partnership. In addition, Lafley Chaired the Hamilton College Board of Trustees, served on the GE board of directors through calendar 2012, and served on the board of Legendary Entertainment from 2011 until the company was sold in 2016. In addition, he consulted on business and innovation strategy, and executive leadership development, and coached experienced, new and potential CEOs.

From his retirement, June 30, 2016, to the present, Lafley has served as a board member and investor in a number of start up, early-stage and private companies including AmberSemi, Figs, Omeza, Snap, Tulco, and US Innovative Technologies, LLC.

In addition, he chaired the master planning and served as founding CEO of the Bay Park Conservancy, the nonprofit private development, fundraising, and management partner of the City of Sarasota. Together, the City and the Park Conservancy are developing a new 53 acre public park with a new performing arts center on Sarasota Bay. The Bay is a $500 million dollar development that completed the first phase of park in October, 2022, and expects to complete the full development in 7 to 10 years.

Lafley continues to coach, mentor and teach CEOs and CEO candidates with CNEXT and Leading to Win, LLC.

== Recognition and thought leadership ==
Lafley is broadly recognized for his business leadership. He was awarded "CEO of the Year 2006" by Chief Executive Magazine and the Peter G. Peterson Award for Business Statesmanship presented by the CED in 2009. In 2010, Lafley received the Edison Achievement Award, in recognition of his contributions to innovation, marketing, and human-centered design. He was also recognized with the 2010 Hall of Achievement Award, the highest honor given by the Grocery Manufacturers Association. In 2011, Lafley was awarded the Warren Bennis Award for Leadership Excellence and inducted into the IndustryWeek Manufacturing Hall of Fame. In 2012, Lafley was inducted into the prestigious Advertising Hall of Fame.

In 2004, Lafley received the Golden Plate Award of the American Academy of Achievement during the International Achievement Summit in Chicago.

In 2008, Lafley and strategy consultant Ram Charan published The Game Changer, an operating manager's guide to turning innovation into strategic advantage. Business Week selected The Game Changer as one of the year's "Top Ten Business Books." Lafley has also authored several critically acclaimed articles for Harvard Business Review, including “What Only the CEO Can Do” (May, 2009), “Executive Pay: Time for CEOs to Take a Stand” (May, 2010), “I Think of My Failures as a Gift” (April 2011), and “The Art and Science of Finding the Right CEO” (October, 2011) co-authored with notable author and leadership consultant, Noel M. Tichy.

In 2010, Lafley was honored with an Edison Achievement Award for his commitment to innovation throughout his career.

In 2013, Lafley and Roger Martin wrote Playing to Win, a practical approach to winning strategy—explaining what strategy is for (winning) and what it's about (choice).
