= Ivey Business School =

Business school of Western University, Ontario, Canada

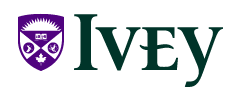
- Former name: Richard Ivey School of Business
- Motto: Inspiring leaders for a sustainable and prosperous world
- Named for: Richard G. Ivey
- Type: Public business school
- Established: 1922 (as a department); 1950; 76 years ago (as a faculty)
- Parent institution: Western University
- Dean: Julian Birkinshaw
- Academic staff: 138
- Students: More than 2,500
- Location: London, Ontario, Canada; 43.00759°N 81.2728°W
- Website: ivey.uwo.ca

Ivey Business School is the main business school of Western University, located in London, Ontario, Canada. It offers full-time undergraduate and graduate programs in London, Ontario and maintains a Toronto facility for its EMBA program and two facilities, Toronto and Hong Kong, for its Ivey Executive Education programs.

== History ==
Business courses were first taught at Western in 1922 and the business school was officially created in 1950, when the School of Business Administration was established as a separate faculty at Western. In 1995, the school was renamed the Richard Ivey School of Business after an $11 million donation by the Richard M. Ivey family. The school is named after Richard G. Ivey, the father of Richard M. Ivey.

In 1998, Ivey was the first North American business school to open a campus in Hong Kong offering business programs at the Cheng Yu Tung Management Institute. In 2010, Ivey became the first North American business school to offer the CEMS Global Alliance in Management Education, joining the likes of London School of Economics, HEC Paris, ESADE, University of St. Gallen, and Bocconi University.

== Rankings ==
The Economist ranked Ivey's MBA program best in Canada for Education Experience, Career Services, and Student Quality in 2021. In 2023, Ivey's MBA program was ranked first in Canada by Bloomberg Businessweek. Financial Times ranked Ivey's Executive Education program number one in Canada.

=== Canadian MBA Alliance ===
The school is also a founding member of the Canadian MBA Alliance which was created in 2013. All six members of the alliance rank among the world's top 100 schools, according to their participation in key rankings – Financial Times, Business Week, and The Economist.

== Locations ==
Ivey operates on four campuses:

- Richard Ivey Building on the main campus of the University of Western Ontario.
- Spencer Leadership Centre (formally known as Spencer Hall) in London, Ontario
- Donald K. Johnson Leadership Centre located in downtown Toronto at the Exchange Tower
- Cheng Yu Tung Management Institute is located in the Hong Kong Convention and Exhibition Centre

On September 10, 2009, Ivey broke ground on a new 235,000-square-foot (21,800 m^{2}) faculty building on the Western campus in front of Brescia University College on former soccer fields. The project cost approximately $110 million, with the federal and provincial governments contributed $50 million in funding with the remainder funded by private donations. The building was to be designed by Hariri Pontarini Architects of Toronto. In September 2013, Ivey officially moved from their old building to new Richard Ivey Building located across campus.

== Publications ==
=== Case studies ===
With over 8,000 cases in their collection, Ivey Publishing adds more than 350 classroom-tested case studies each year. Ivey is among the largest producers and publishers of cases all around the world, just behind Harvard Business School. In 2014, Ivey signed deals with Indian Institute of Management Calcutta to design and publish case studies.

=== Ivey Business Journal ===
Ivey Business Journal (IBJ) started in 1933 as the Quarterly Review of Commerce. The publication transitioned from a quarterly magazine to a bi-monthly web publication in the 2000s and is read in over 150 countries. The current editor of the journal is Thomas Watson.

=== Ivey Business Review ===
Ivey Business Review (IBR) is an undergraduate publication dealing with business strategy, written and managed by students in the honours business administration program at the School. It is published twice per academic year, in December and April, and is managed at the school's main campus in London, Ontario. Published copies of IBR are available in print formator on the publication's website. Since its inception, the magazine has published eight issues containing over 100 total articles and involving more than 150 students.

The Review is an original research–based publication with all content created for the magazine through collaboration between the writers and members of the editorial board. It focuses on providing actionable recommendations for specific businesses, industries, business models, strategies, or events, rather than management techniques for managers and leaders.

== Ivey Purchasing Managers Index ==
The Ivey Purchasing Managers Index (IPMI), also known as the Ivey PMI, is an economic indicator in Canada that reflects month-to-month changes in the dollar value of purchases as reported by a panel of purchasing managers across various sectors. Jointly sponsored by the Purchasing Management Association of Canada (PMAC)—now integrated into the Supply Chain Management Association (SCMA)—and the Ivey Business School, the index serves as a key measure of economic activity in Canada.

== Notable alumni and faculty ==
- Thomas H. Bailey, founder Janus Capital
- Tima Bansal, Chaired Professor of Strategy, director of Ivey's Centre on Building Sustainable Value
- Hitish "Tesher" Sharma, Canadian rapper and singer-songwriter
- Sukhinder Singh Cassidy, founder and chairman, TheBoardlist, tech founder and executive
- John Chayka, general manager, Toronto Maple Leafs
- Henry Cheng, chairman, New World Development Co. Ltd.
- Dean A. Connor, president and CEO, Sun Life Financial
- George Cope, former president and CEO, Bell Canada
- Cynthia Devine, CFO, Maple Leafs Sports and Entertainment, former CFO, RioCan REIT, Tim Hortons Inc.
- Bob Singh Dhillon, venture capitalist, CBC's Dragon's Den
- David Furnish, executive and board, Ogilvy & Mather
- Don Getty, Premier of Alberta
- Stephen K. Gunn, co-founder and chairman, Sleep Country Canada
- Tim Hodgson, member of Parliament and Minister of Energy and Natural Resources
- Donald K. Johnson, advisory board, BMO Capital Markets
- Michael Katchen, founder and CEO, Wealthsimple
- Gar Knutson, member of Parliament
- Arkadi Kuhlmann, chairman and CEO, ING Group
- Simu Liu, actor, Shang-Chi and the Legend of the Ten Rings, former accountant, Deloitte
- Christine Magee, co-founder and president, Sleep Country Canada
- Michael McCain, president and CEO, Maple Leaf Foods
- David I. McKay, president and CEO, Royal Bank of Canada
- Pierre Morrisette, founder, Pelmorex, operator of The Weather Network
- Ray Muzyka, CEO, BioWare
- Richard Nesbitt, president and CEO, CIBC World Markets, former CEO, TMX Group
- Dave Nichol, founder, President's Choice
- Robert Nourse, founder Bombay Company
- Kevin O'Leary, venture capitalist, CBC's Dragon's Den
- Larry Rosen, chairman and CEO, Harry Rosen Inc.
- Ray Sharma, founder and CEO, XMG Studio
- Charles Sousa, former MPP and Minister of Finance
- Bernard Trottier, former member of Parliament
- Charlie Wall-Andrews, music industry executive and scholar
- Prem Watsa, CEO, Fairfax Financial Holdings
- Darryl White, CEO, Bank of Montreal

== See also ==
- List of business schools in Canada
