= Drag race (disambiguation) =

A drag race is a motorsport racing event.

Drag race or drag racer may also refer to:

- RuPaul's Drag Race, an American reality television series about drag queens

- Drag Race (franchise)

- "Drag Racer" (song), a 1976 instrumental song by the Doug Wood Band
- Drag Racer (video game), a 2003 flash game developed by Phantom Games
- Drag Race, a 2010 remix album by RuPaul

== See also ==
- Drag boat racing, a form of drag racing which takes place on water rather than land
- High Heel Drag Queen Race, a road race
- Drag Race Eliminator, a 1986 computer game
