= Larry Rosen (executive) =

Canadian businessman (born 1956)

Larry Rosen CM
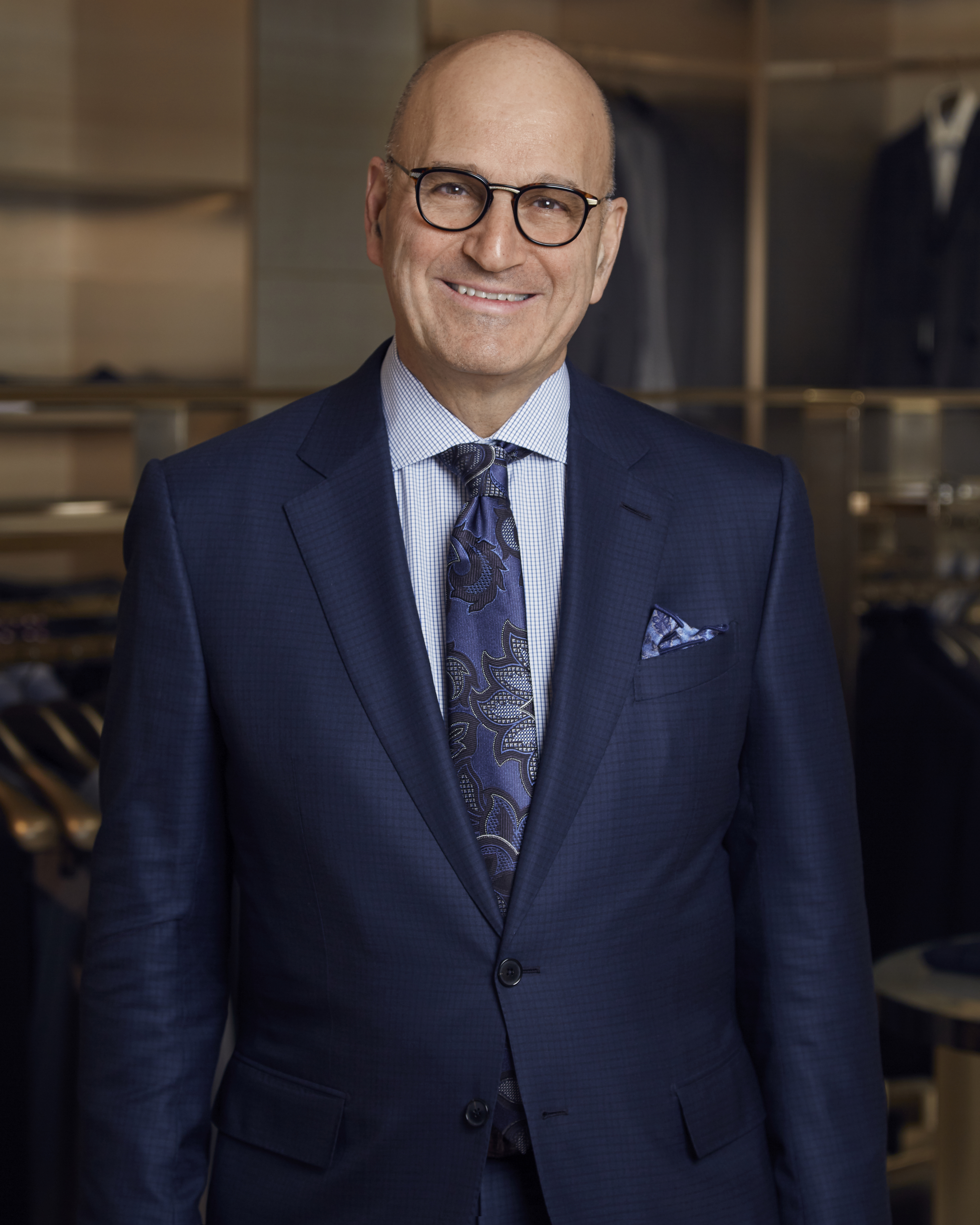
- Born: March 8, 1956 (age 70); Toronto, Ontario, Canada
- Education: University of Toronto, University of Western Ontario
- Occupation: Retail executive
- Years active: 1985–present
- Organization: Harry Rosen Inc.
- Title: Chairman and CEO
- Board member of: Princess Margaret Cancer Foundation (2010–2019); Ivey School of Business Entrepreneurship Advisory Council; Ivey Advisory Board (2006–2019)
- Parent(s): Harry Rosen, Evelyn Rosen

Larry Rosen CM (born March 8, 1956) is the chairman and CEO of Harry Rosen Inc., a privately owned, luxury menswear chain based in Toronto, Ontario, Canada.

== Early life ==
Rosen was born in Toronto, eldest son of Harry Rosen, founder of Harry Rosen Inc., and Evelyn Rosen. As a teenager, he worked in his father's stores as a sales associate. He completed a BA in economics from University College at the University of Toronto, and continued his studies at the University of Western Ontario, earning a joint MBA and LLB in 1982. Rosen briefly practised corporate law before joining the family company in 1985.

== Career ==
Larry Rosen joined Harry Rosen Inc. as a buyer in 1985. He occupied several management roles in operations and buying before his appointment as president and COO in 1997. Rosen was named CEO in 2000.

He spearheaded expansion plans for the chain, totaling 18 stores in eight major Canadian markets and has led the family-owned company to considerable success, including increased sales of over $300 million per year. The company celebrated its 65th anniversary in 2019.

== Awards ==
Harry Rosen Inc. was named one of Canada's Top 50 Best Managed Companies in 2007 and has maintained Platinum status since.

Larry Rosen was awarded 2014's Distinguished Retailer of the Year by the Retail Council of Canada, a committee of peers in the Canadian retail industry. Also in 2014, the company was named one of the 10 Most Influential Stores in Menswear by MR Magazine, a trade publication.

In December 2019, Larry Rosen was appointed as a Member of the Order of Canada for his accomplishments in business and philanthropy.

== Philanthropic Work ==
In 2014, Harry Rosen, Inc. sponsored the first Golf to Conquer Cancer event in support of the Princess Margaret Cancer Centre. The single-day event raised over $800,000. As a board member for the Princess Margaret Cancer Foundation, Rosen also started the annual Harry's Spring Run Off event in 2005 as a fundraiser for cancer research. The event runs each year and has raised over $3 million to date.
