= Bob Singh Dhillon =

Canadian businessman

Bob Singh Dhillion
- Born: 1965 (age 60–61); Kobe, Japan
- Education: Richard Ivey School of Business
- Occupations: Founder and CEO of Mainstreet Equity Corp

Navjeet Singh "Bob" Dhillon OC is a Canadian property owner and businessman. He is the founder and CEO of Mainstreet Equity Corp, headquartered in Calgary.

== Early life and education ==
Navjeet Singh "Bob" Dhillon was born in 1965, in Kobe, Japan to Punjabi Sikh parents. His family ancestry comes from the Tallewal district of Barnala Punjab, India. His grandfather, Saproon Singh Dhillon moved to Hong Kong from India to establish a shipping company and carry out trade with Japan. He lived between Hong Kong and Japan, before being sent to India for his education. He attended the Bishop Cotton School in Shimla. While in school, Dhillon's family was living and conducting business in Liberia, however were forced to leave due to civil unrest. Dhillon and his family moved to Vancouver, before moving to Calgary. Dhillion obtained an MBA from the Richard Ivey School of Business at the University of Western Ontario.

== Business ==
Dhillon founded Mainstreet Equity Corp in 1997, taking the company public and listing it on the Toronto Stock Exchange under (TSX: MEQ) in 2000. The Canada-based real estate company is the only Sikh-owned company listed on the Toronto Stock Exchange. Mainstreet owns nearly 18500, rental units across Western Canada. Dhillon is developing a high-end tourist resort in Belize, a nation for which he is also the honorary consul general to Canada.

== Philanthropy ==
In 2018, he made a $10 million donation to the University of Lethbridge – the largest donation in the university's history. The money is being used by the newly named Dhillon School of Business. Through Mainstreet, Dhillon has also provided homes for many refugees, including those fleeing Alberta wildfires in 2016, Afghans fleeing Taliban rule in 2021, He has also provided free rent for Saskatoon Chabad when they needed it and Ukrainians fleeing the Russian invasion in 2022.

== Awards ==
On 29 December 2021, Her Excellency Honorable Mary Simon, the Governor General appointed the Order of Canada to Dhillon. Officers of the Order of Canada (OC) have demonstrated a level of talent and service to Canadians.

Dhillon has also been awarded an honorary doctorate in commerce from Lakehead University, and an honorary doctorate of laws from the University of Lethbridge.
