= Ray Sharma =

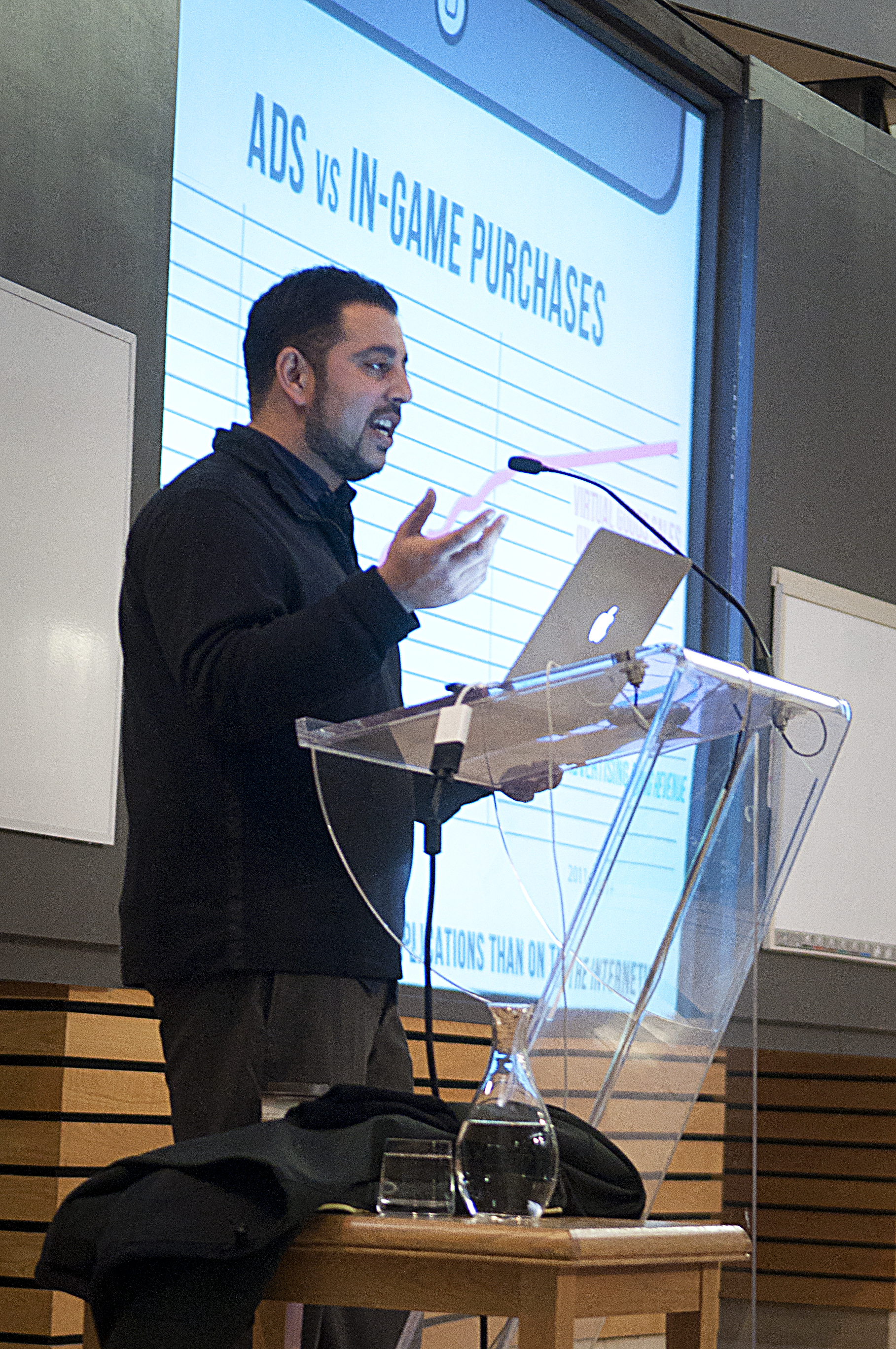
- Sharma at OneEleven in Toronto
- Born: Anandpur Sahib, Punjab, India
- Education: University of Western Ontario; Ivey Business School
- Occupations: Venture capitalist; entrepreneur; former equity research analyst

Ray Sharma is a Canadian venture capitalist and entrepreneur. He co-founded Extreme Venture Partners and founded XMG Studio.

== Early life and education ==
Sharma was born in Anandpur Sahib, Punjab, India. He received a Bachelor of Arts in Business Administration from the Ivey Business School at the University of Western Ontario.

== Career ==
He was ranked among the top technology analysts in Greenwich and Brendan Woods International surveys of fund managers for five of eight eligible years, and covered BlackBerry, Handspring, and other technology companies.

In 2007, he co-founded Extreme Venture Partners, an early-stage venture capital firm in Toronto. He later co-founded Xtreme Labs, a mobile app development firm that was acquired by Pivotal Labs in 2013. Sharma co-founded Extreme Accelerator which offered funding, mentorship, and resources for startups relocating to Canada. In 2009, he founded XMG Studio, a mobile game developer and publisher. In 2012, Sharma oversaw the development of the prototype "Matchbox" created in a hackathon within Xtreme Labs, subsequently renamed Tinder.

== Other roles ==
Sharma has spoken at mobile industry events including Interactive Ontario's iP3 Forum, the 2013 Milken Institute Global Conference, the 2012 Application Developers Conference hosted by Scotia Capital, and the 2010 CTIA Mobile Web and Apps World Forum. In February 2013, Sharma participated in a discussion panel with Tony Clement and other entrepreneurs and developers over the open data made available by the Canadian government. Through XMG Studio, he founded The Great Canadian Appathon in 2011, an app-building competition for Canadian university students.

Sharma is also a guest author for Pocket Gamer and The Globe and Mail. He has also served on the Ontario Judicial Council, the Government of Canada's Advisory Panel on Open Government and the Royal Ontario Museum's Board of Trustees. He is also the creator of the Canadian Open Data Experience (CODE), which is Canada's largest open data hackathon. In 2015, Sharma co-founded Hackergal - a not-for-profit organization that aims to introduce young girls to coding. In that same year, he also co-founded Hackworks, a Toronto-based company that specializes in executing hackathons and open innovation events.

In 2019, an Ontario Superior Court ruling found that Chamath Palihapitiya and two former partners at Extreme Venture Partners conspired to hide an interest in dating app Tinder as part of a sale of shares in Xtreme Labs - resulting in the three paying $15.69 million to Extreme Venture Partner's current partners and co-founders, and ruling in favor of Sharma.

Since 2020, Sharma has sat on the Technical Advisory Committee at the Duality Accelerator at the University of Chicago. In 2024, he was given the Ivey Alumni Achievement Award.

In 2026, Sharma published "The Concise Startup Funding Handbook: A founder's guide to raising capital", reaching #1 Best Seller on Amazon for Investing, Corporate Finance, and Starting a Business.

== Recognition ==
Sharma received the 2024 Ivey Alumni Achievement Award from the Ivey Business School.
