= Drag Racer (video game) =

- Developers: XMG Studio, Phantom Games
- Publishers: XMG Studio, Phantom Games
- Platforms: Adobe Flash, iPod Touch, iPhone, iPad
- Release: 2003, 2009, 2010, 2012
- Genres: Gaming, Family & Arcade, Racing
- Modes: Single Player, Multiplayer

The Drag Racer franchise is a series of games that were developed by Waterloo, Ontario-based game designer Adam Telfer, who started designing this flash game at the age of 14. The game, first released in 2003 was later ported to iOS devices (iPod Touch, iPhone, and iPad) as a partnership with XMG Studio. The core game-play in Drag Racer is quite simple. Players purchase cars that they customize, upgrade, tune and then race opponents in an effort to win credits that allows them to upgrade existing cars or buy new ones.

The PC version has over 50 million views on newgrounds and has a huge active user-base. After the game was ported to iOS devices by XMG Studio, the version has acquired more than 2 million downloads resulting in hundreds of millions of races. The current iOS versions available on iTunes are Drag Racer Pro Tuner and Drag Racer Perfect Run.

== Description ==
Drag Racer is a series of racing games that allows users to create and customize cars and race them on a drag racing strip. The controls are simple (a gas pedal and gear shifter) but the races are challenging. The players can manually tune their cars for better performance by reducing the weight, adding nitrous oxide, enhancing the engine, computer, drivetrain, exhaust and induction or upgrading the ignition and more. Additionally, the player can choose from a large number of customization options, ranging from simple paint (the colours are in RGB) to editing the outside parts (like rims, spoilers etc.), adding decals and finishing the look with a custom picture.

Drag Racer: Flash Game was released in 2003 by Adam Telfer. It was launched on Newgrounds, where at times it has had 50 million users. Version 2 of Drag Racer was launched and featured on the first page for almost two years. In 2004 Version 3 was launched on Newgrounds and featured on the front page for over a year.

Drag Racer: Perfect Run was the first Drag Racer game to be ported onto the iOS platform by XMG Studio. After four months of coding, Perfect Run was launched on the Appstore in 2009.

Drag Racer: ProTuner was first released on iOS in December 2009. The side-scrolling racing game features over 40 cars, trucks and bikes to select from. The game allows players to customize their drag racer with paint jobs, custom decals or personalized pictures or photos. Once designed the player can post screenshots of the dragster to Facebook and share it with friends. Players can race their cars against friends. Players can tune gear ratios, tire compounds, and boost suspension to maximize the performance of their cars.

Drag Racer: World is the fourth entry in the Drag Racer series. Drag Racer World allows players to customize their rides and challenge friends to race online. Players can customize their dragster by upgrading, painting or tuning for better performance. Players can connect with the Drag Racer World online community and become part of its global racing circuit. Winning races earns in-game "points" to spend on customizing, upgrading and buying higher performance cars. Global release is expected in May 2012.
