= Arkadi Kuhlmann =

Canadian businessman and writer

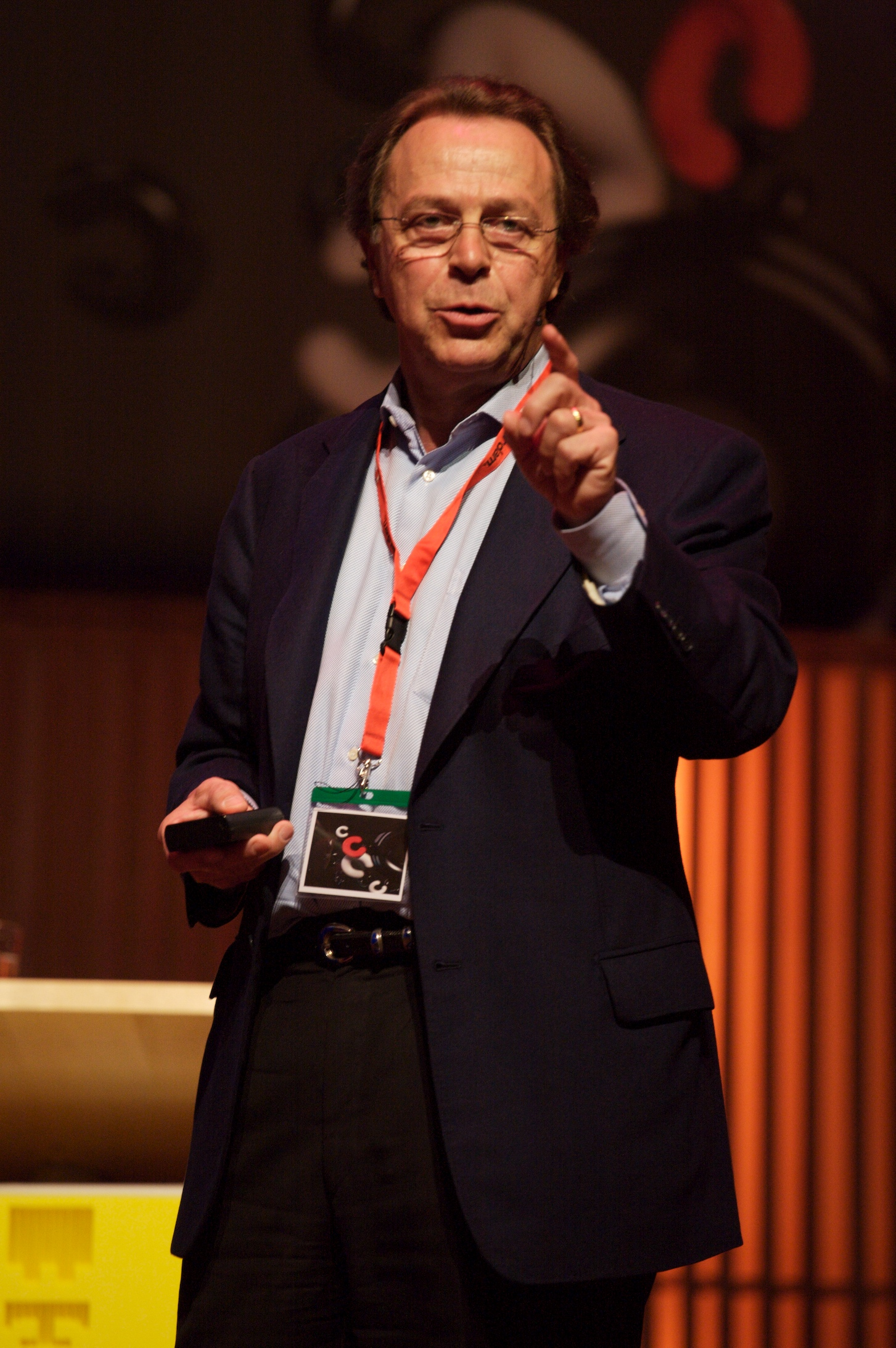
- Kuhlman in 2008
- Born: October 27, 1946 (age 80); Canada
- Education: University of Western Ontario, Richard Ivey School of Business
- Occupations: Banker, businessman
- Known for: former CEO of both ING Direct Canada and US

Arkadi Kuhlmann (born October 27, 1946) is an American-Canadian businessman. He is best known as a banker, having been CEO of both ING Direct Canada and ING Direct USA. In July 2012, Arkadi founded his sixth banking startup, ZenBanx, and was as its CEO before selling the business to SoFi in February 2017.

In 2010, he was awarded an honorary Doctor of Laws (LL.D.) from the University of Western Ontario for his contributions to the world of business strategy.

== Early life and education ==
Kuhlmann received an Honors B.A. in business administration along with an MBA from the Richard Ivey School of Business.

== Career ==
Kuhlmann began his career as a business professor shortly after graduating from the University of Western Ontario. He soon gravitated to banking as an assistant director of the Institute of Canadian Bankers, and as a consultant for the banking industry.

Between 1977-1984, Kuhlmann was manager, assistant general manager, and then Vice President of Royal Bank of Canada in its corporate cash management and commercial banking marketing divisions.

In May 1986, Kuhlmann was named president and CEO of Deak & Co. and Deak International. Deak & Co. provided merchant and investment banking services. Deak International provided foreign exchange and precious metals trading and refining services. Kuhlmann reorganized Deak International's operations, re-launching the company in April 1986, expanding the company from 52 to 192 branches worldwide, and from 350 to 1,500 employees. Kuhlmann oversaw the successful divestiture of Deak International in 1990. Following the divestiture of Deak International to North American Life, Kuhlmann was president of North American Trust until 1996.

Kuhlmann founded ING Direct Canada in 1996. He created the brand strategy, recruited the senior leadership team, and grew the bank from 1996 to 2000 as the bank's president and CEO. He then repeated this process in 2000, when he founded ING Direct USA and led its growth to become the largest savings bank and number one direct bank in the United States, with more than $90B in deposits and 7.8M customers.

He instituted an annual vote where he asked his staff to "re-elect" him as CEO. He went on to write his book titled, Rock Then Roll: The Secrets of Culture Driven Leadership, to better understand how culture plays a driving force in modern corporations.

In late 2009, as a condition of its government bailout during the financial crisis, ING Groep, the parent company of ING Direct Canada and USA, and the largest Dutch financial-services firm, agreed on a restructuring plan with the European Commission. The restructuring plan mandated that ING Groep sell its North American online banking operations, which included ING Direct USA and Canada. On June 17, 2011, ING Groep agreed to sell ING Direct USA, and its seven million customers, to Capital One Financial for $9.2B. The Federal Reserve approved the sale on February 14, 2012 and Capital One completed its acquisition of ING Direct USA on February 17, 2012.

ING Direct Canada, founded by Kuhlmann in 1996, was purchased from ING Groep by Scotiabank for $3.13 billion in an acquisition announced on August 29, 2012.

Following the ING Direct USA acquisition, Kuhlmann stepped down as chairman and CEO.

== Author ==
Kuhlmann has authored two books on business. The first, The Orange Code: How ING Direct Succeeded by Being a Rebel With a Cause, he co-authored with long-time collaborator, Bruce Philp. The book was published in 2009 by John Wiley & Sons.

His second book, Rock Then Roll: The Secrets of Culture-Driven Leadership, was written as a solo effort. In an interview with Forbes, he stated it was a book for all his ING Direct associates, and a blueprint for how the "protest generation" should think about corporate culture. Deak & Company published Rock Then Roll in 2011.

He has written several other books on finance, including Prime Cash: First Steps in Treasury Management, authored with F. John Mathis and James Mills, First Edition: April, 1983; and numerous university business cases. His thoughts on banking, leadership, and innovation have appeared in major newspapers, including The Wall Street Journal, The Washington Post, and The New York Times.

== Volunteer ==
Kuhlmann was honorary chair for the 2005 "More Than Houses Campaign" for Habitat for Humanity of New Castle County, Delaware.

During his tenure as CEO of ING Direct, Kuhlmann formed the ING Direct Kids Foundation with a mandate to help children improve their financial literacy.

Kuhlmann is a director at Christiana Care Health System, Inc, and the Council for Economic Education.

== Personal ==
In his personal time, Kuhlmann goes to his island in Georgian Bay, where he sails on a private boat.

Kuhlmann is also known for his love of riding motorbikes. He has two Harleys. In recent years, he's been devoting more time to painting and poetry.
