= Sukhinder Singh Cassidy =

Technology executive

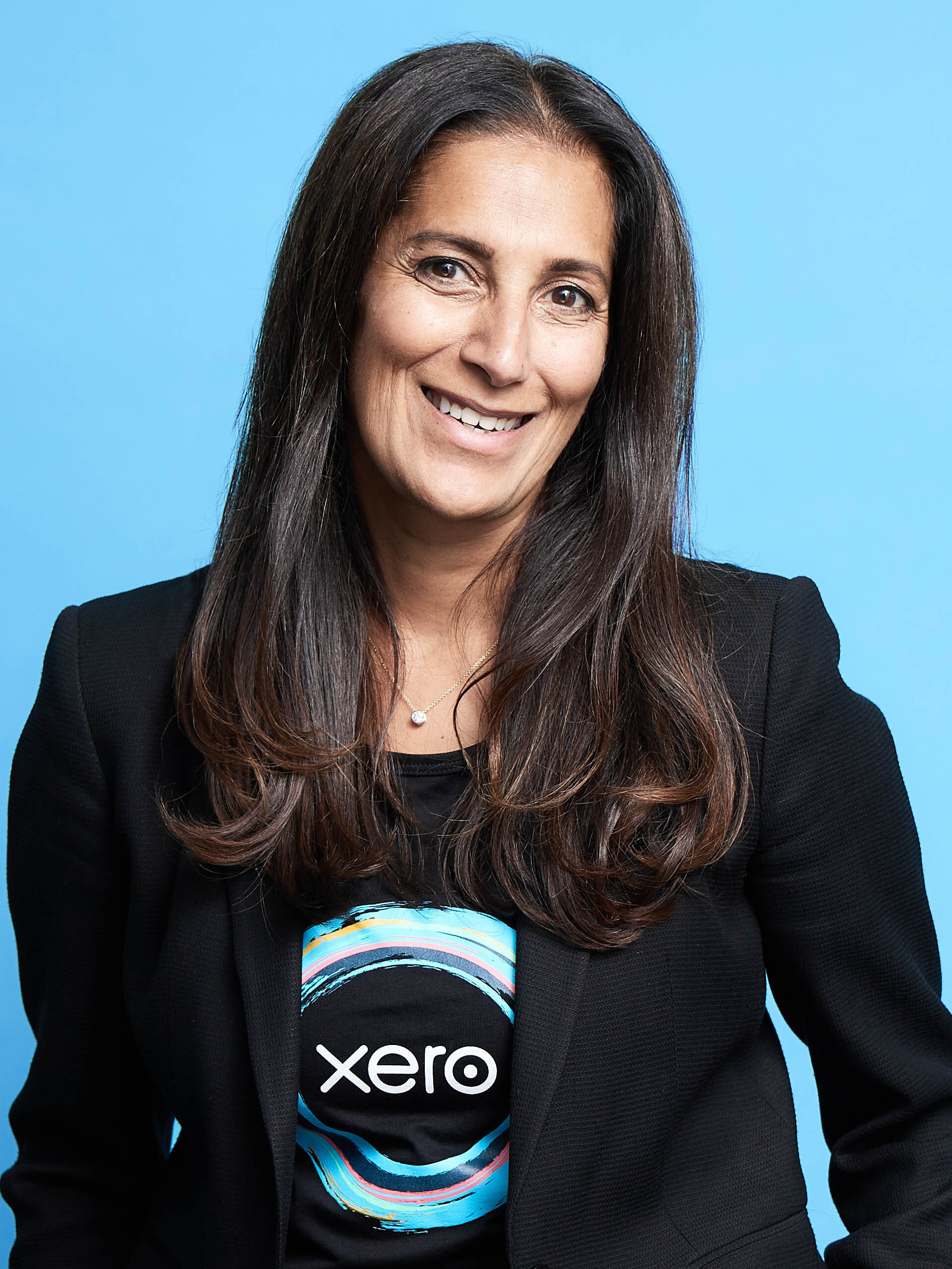
- Cassidy in 2023
- Born: Sukhinder Singh; 1970 (age 55–56); Dar es Salaam, Tanzania
- Education: University of Western Ontario, Richard Ivey School of Business
- Occupation: Businessperson
- Spouse: Simon Cassidy
- Children: 2

Sukhinder Singh Cassidy (born Sukhinder Singh in 1970) is a technology executive and entrepreneur. She is the CEO of Xero, a New Zealand-based accounting software company, and former president of StubHub. She has worked at various technology and media companies, including Google, Amazon and Sky UK, Yodlee (YODL), and Polyvore. She was the founder of Joyus (often stylized as JOYUS), a video shopping platform, and the Boardlist.

== Early life and education ==
Singh Cassidy was born in 1970 in Dar es Salaam, Tanzania, to parents of Indian Punjabi Sikh descent. Her family moved to St. Catharines, Ontario, Canada, when she was two years old. She grew up in the Niagara Region. Singh Cassidy graduated from the University of Western Ontario and earned her honours degree in business administration from that university's Ivey School of Business in 1992.

Singh Cassidy was raised in an entrepreneurial family. Both of her parents were doctors and ran a medical practice for thirty years.

== Career ==
=== Early career ===
Singh Cassidy started her career in investment banking at Merrill Lynch in New York. She moved to the bank's London office in 1994. She then worked as an analyst for Sky UK.

In 1998, Singh Cassidy moved to Silicon Valley and joined e-commerce startup Junglee as head of business development. Junglee was acquired by Amazon in 1998. Following the acquisition, Singh Cassidy joined Amazon, where she led merchant business development for the first generation of Amazon marketplace.

Singh Cassidy co-founded financial services platform Yodlee in 1999 with five engineering co-founders and served as SVP of sales and business development from 1999 to 2003. In 2014, Yodlee went public, trading under the ticker YODL.

In 2003, Singh Cassidy joined Google as the first general manager for Google Local and Maps, and head of content acquisition for Books, Scholar, Shopping and Video. There she launched Google Local and Maps, with product manager Bret Taylor and a team of engineers. In 2004, she became head of Google's international operations in Asia Pacific (APAC) and Latin America (LATAM), becoming VP in 2005 and then president of those markets in 2008. Singh Cassidy is credited with building Google's presence across 103 countries in Asia Pacific and Latin America.

In 2009, Singh Cassidy left Google to become CEO-in-residence at venture capital firm Accel Partners. Singh Cassidy was named CEO of Polyvore in 2010.

=== Joyus ===
In October 2010, Singh Cassidy had the idea for a new platform driving e-commerce via video. She founded Joyus in January, 2011 in San Francisco, California. Joyus launched to the public in August 2011. Singh Cassidy raised $7.9 million in seed funding from Accel Partners, Harrison Metal, Joel Hyatt, Venky Harinarayan & Anand Rajaraman. In 2012, Joyus raised a second round of funding totaling $11.5 million from Interwest and Time Warner, as well as existing investors.

Singh Cassidy served as CEO and then chairman until 2017. JOYUS was acquired by StackCommerce in September 2017.

=== #ChoosePossibility Project and theBoardlist ===
In May 2015, Singh Cassidy published an open letter, titled "Tech Women Choose Possibility", challenging the tech community to increase the rate of progress for women in the industry by leveraging its wealth of existing female talent. The letter was co-signed by 59 female entrepreneurs and investors. Singh Cassidy based the letter on her own experiences as a tech entrepreneur and research she conducted on 230 female founders and CEOs of tech companies.

Cassidy launched theBoardlist, stylized in all lowercase letters, the first initiative of the #ChoosePossibility Project, on July 15, 2015. TheBoardlist is an online marketplace that connects CEOs who are looking for board candidates with women who are peer-endorsed for private and public tech company boards. When it launched, theBoardlist included the names of over 600 women who had been endorsed by 50 investors and CEOs in the tech industry, from companies including Accel Partners, Greylock Partners, Twitter, Lyft and Box.

On October 20, 2015, theBoardlist announced that it had facilitated its first placement of a woman to the board of a private tech company.

As of November 2017, theBoardlist had attracted over 1,400 executives to nominate over 2,100 women for board service, and influenced over 100 board placements.

Singh Cassidy was president of StubHub from April 2018 until May 2020.

=== Xero ===
On November 10, 2022, Singh Cassidy was named as CEO of Xero Ltd, a New Zealand-headquartered technology company and provider of cloud-based accounting tools for small and medium-sized businesses and accountants. Starting with Xero on November 28, Singh Cassidy formally became CEO on 1 February 2023.

In March 2023, Singh Cassidy announced the removal of 700-800 roles across Xero, representing approximately 15% of the employee base.

== Personal life ==
Singh Cassidy is married to Simon Cassidy, a fellow Canadian and former hedge-fund manager who runs an independent investment firm. The couple have two children and live in the San Francisco Bay Area.

In May 2025, Singh Cassidy joined the ownership group for the Toronto Tempo, a WNBA Team.

== Board member and advisor ==
As of August 2024, Singh Cassidy serves as a public board director at Upstart. She previously served on the boards of J. Crew Group, Inc. (JCG), StitchFix, TripAdvisor (TRIP), Ericsson (ERIC), and Urban Outfitters (URBN) and was as an advisor to Twitter.

== Angel investing ==
Singh Cassidy is an angel investor whose investments include:

- the Real Real
- Soma Water
- J. Hilburn
