= Pratima Bansal =

Canadian economist and management professor

Pratima Bansal FRSC
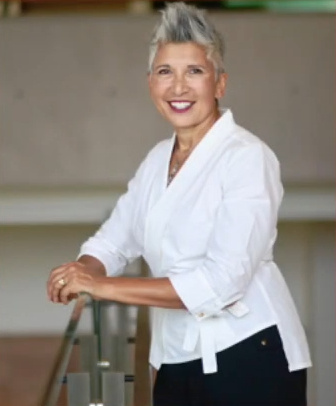

Academic background
- Education: B.A., University of Calgary; M.A., University of Western Ontario; DPhil., University of Oxford
- Thesis: Why do firms go green?: the case for organisational legitimacy (1996)

Academic work
- Institutions: Western University

Pratima "Tima" Bansal is a Canadian management scholar who is the Tier 1 Canada Research Chair in Business Sustainability at the Ivey Business School, Western University. Her research focuses on the intersection of corporate strategy, systems thinking, and sustainable development. She is a Fellow of the Royal Society of Canada and a Fellow of the Academy of Management, and has received the Hellmuth Prize for Achievement in Research and the Panmure House Prize.

== Education ==
Bansal earned a BA) in economics from the University of Calgary in 1983 and an MA in economics from the University of Western Ontario in 1984. She completed her doctoral studies in management studies at the University of Oxford, receiving her MPhil in 1993 and her DPhil in 1996. Her doctoral thesis, titled The Corporate Response to Ecological Issues, examined how firms respond to environmental concerns.

== Career ==
Bansal worked as a government economist and management consultant for Nichols Applied Management in Edmonton. She was an assistant professor at Georgia State University from 1995 to 1999 before joining the faculty at Western University in 1999. She has held visiting appointments at the University of Oxford, the University of Cambridge, and Monash University.

Bansal served as an associate editor of the Academy of Management Journal (AMJ) from 2010 until 2013 and as a deputy editor from 2016 to 2019. She co-authored a 2018 AMJ editorial, "New Ways of Seeing through Qualitative Research," which outlined approaches to qualitative research publication in the journal.

In 2025, Bansal was invited to deliver the Clarendon Lectures in Management Studies at the University of Oxford, a series that forms the basis of a book published by Oxford University Press. In the same year, she delivered the Adrian Fernando Memorial Lecture at the Smith School of Enterprise and the Environment, University of Oxford, in which she discussed why sustainability-related education does not stick in business schools.

In 2003, Basal established the Network for Business Sustainability as a response to the research–practice gap in business sustainability. It has grown into a network of more than 35,000 researchers, managers, and students.

In 2005, Basal founded the Centre for Building Sustainable Value research center at the Ivey Business School. The center coordinates research on the strategic value of sustainability and has been instrumental in integrating sustainability into Ivey's curriculum.

In 2019, Basal launched Innovation North, an innovation laboratory that brings together researchers and managers to create a systems innovation process. It has collaborated with industries such as finance, agriculture, and construction, and applies systems thinking to help organizations navigate systemic challenges.

== Research ==
Bansal's early research identifies competitiveness, legitimation, and ecological responsibility as the key drivers of corporate environmentalism. Her longitudinal studies, including "Evolving Sustainably: A Longitudinal Study of Corporate Sustainable Development" (2005), examine how firms integrate social and environmental concerns into their core strategies over time.

Basal's research has moved into systems thinking in business. She examines the dimensions of time, space, and scale in strategy, arguing that businesses are nested within broader social and ecological systems. This perspective holds that the long-term health of the firm depends on the stability of the natural and social systems in which it is embedded.

Through Innovation North, she has developed frameworks for systems innovation that encourage firms to account for systemic feedback loops rather than relying on linear innovation models. Her research identifies organizational short-termism (the disparity between financial reporting cycles and ecological timescales) as a key constraint on sustainability.

== Selected publications ==
- Bansal, P., & Roth, K. (2000). "Why Companies Go Green: A Model of Ecological Responsiveness." Academy of Management Journal, 43(4), 717–736.
- Bansal, P. (2005). "Evolving Sustainably: A Longitudinal Study of Corporate Sustainable Development." Strategic Management Journal, 26(3), 197–218.
- Bansal, P., & DesJardine, M. R. (2014). "Business Sustainability: It Is About Time." Strategic Organization, 12(1), 70–78.
- Bansal, P., Smith, W. K., & Vaara, E. (2018). "New Ways of Seeing through Qualitative Research." Academy of Management Journal, 61(4), 1189–1195.

== Media ==
Bansal has contributed to Forbes, where she writes on "how leaders can create value for their organizations and society." Her research and commentary have appeared in The Wall Street Journal and The Guardian. In 2013, she delivered a TEDx talk at TEDxWesternU titled "The Sustainability Challenge that Business Can't Ignore."

== Awards and recognition ==
- Ideas Worth Teaching Awards (2018), awarded by the Aspen Institute Business & Society Program for integrating sustainability throughout Ivey's MBA curriculum.
- Fellow of the Royal Society of Canada (2018): Elected for her work in organizational sustainability.
- Fellow of the Academy of Management (2020).
- Honorary doctorates from the University of Hamburg (2020), HEC Montréal and the Université de Montréal (2022), and Vrije Universiteit Amsterdam (2023).
- Hellmuth Prize for Achievement in Research (2021), Western University's highest research award.
- Panmure House Prize (2025), a US$75,000 prize awarded for interdisciplinary research advancing long-term thinking in economics.
