= Olaf Lange (basketball) =

German basketball coach

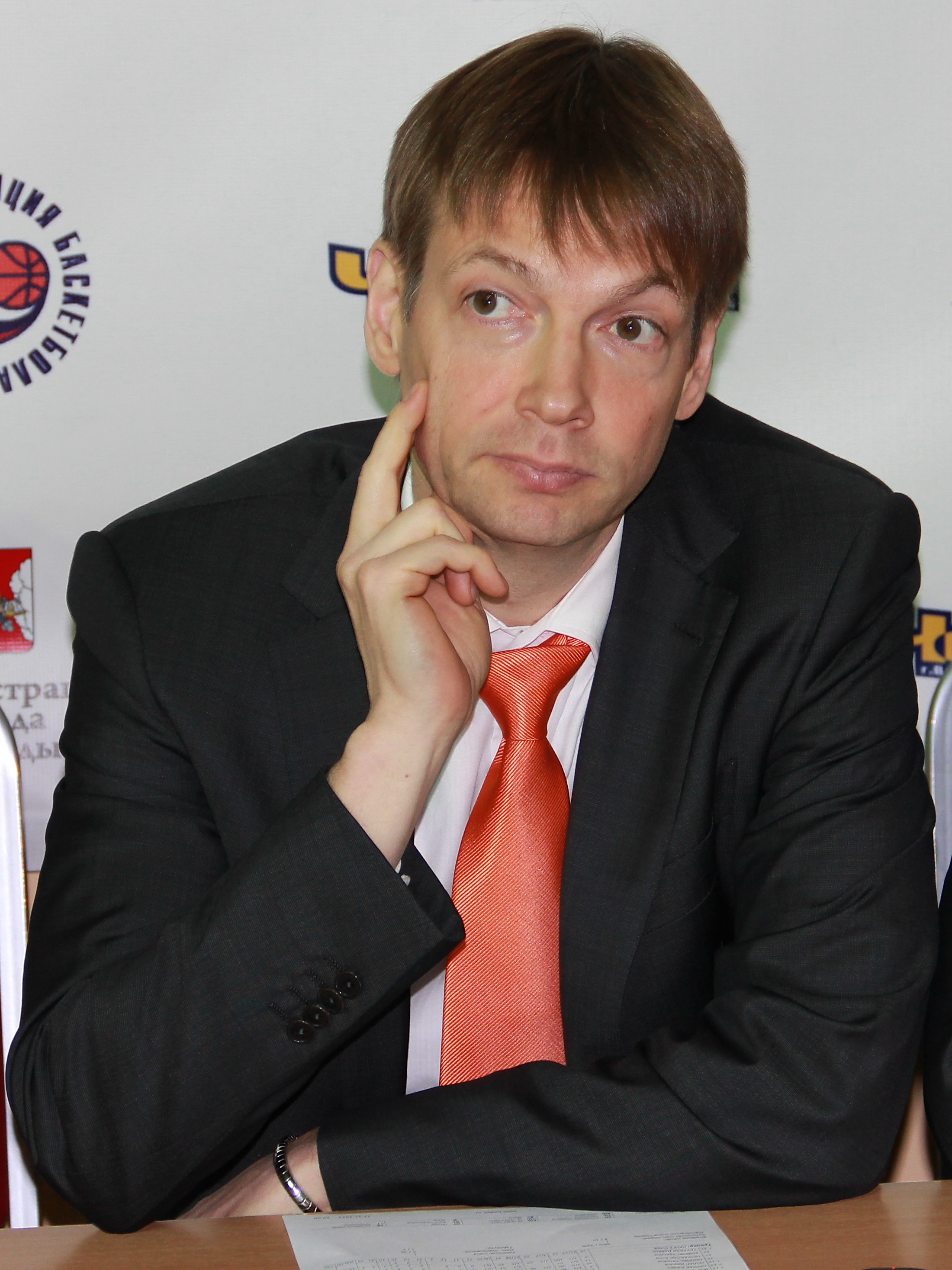
- Olaf Lange (2013)

Toronto Tempo
- Position: Associate head coach
- League: WNBA

Personal information
- Born: March 30, 1972 (age 54) Berlin, Germany

Career information
- High school: Ulrich-von-Hutten Gymnasium (1984–1991)
- College: Freie Universität Berlin / Humboldt Universität zu Berlin (1991–1995)
- Coaching career: 1995–present

Career history

Coaching
- 1995–1997: BTV 1846 Wuppertal (assistant)
- 1997–2002: BTV 1846/Gold-Zack Wuppertal
- 1999–2002: Germany U20 Women's
- 2001–2003: Germany women's
- 2003: Germany U20 Men's
- 2003: German A2 Men National Team Program
- 2003–2004: Mitteldeutscher BC (assistant)
- 2004: Ros Casares Valencia
- 2005–2007: Liberty (women's associate HC)
- 2007–2009: San Antonio Silver Stars (assistant)
- 2010: San Antonio Silver Stars (associate HC)
- 2010–2012: BDS Logan Thunder
- 2012–2018: UMMC Ekaterinburg
- 2017–2019: Russia women's
- 2019–2021: Chicago Sky (assistant)
- 2019–2025: Australia women's (assistant)
- 2022–2025: New York Liberty (assistant)
- 2025–present: Germany women's
- 2026–present: Toronto Tempo (associate HC)

Career highlights
- As head coach: 2× FIBA EuroLeague Championship - Women (2013, 2016); 5× Russian Women's Basketball Premier League Champions (2013–2017); 5× German Championship (1998–2002); As assistant coach: 2× WNBA champion (2021, 2024); WNBA Commissioner's Cup Champion (2023); FIBA Europe Cup - Men (2004); FIBA EuroLeague Championship - Women (1996)

Olaf Lange (born March 30, 1972) is a German professional basketball coach who is the associate head coach for the Toronto Tempo of the WNBA and head coach for the Germany women's national team.

Lange has made many different stops during his coaching career in both the WNBA and EuroLeague. He's been an assistant coach in the WNBA for both the Chicago Sky and San Antonio Silver Stars. Lange has also experienced multiple head coaching positions with Ros Casares, Logan Thunder, and UMMC Ekaterinburg. Lange also has coached for the German, Russian and Australian Basketball National Teams.

== Coaching career ==
=== National teams ===
==== Germany ====
Lange was named the head coach the German U20 Women's National Team in 1999, a position which he held until 2002. He became the National Teams head coach in 2001. He coach the women's team until 2003.

Following his stint with the women's national team, Lange became the German U20 Men's Head Coach. He held that position for 6 months in 2003.

In October 2025, he was named head coach of the women's senior team.

==== Russia ====
In 2017, the Russia Basketball Federal tabbed Lange to be their new Women's National Team head coach. Lange coached the Russians at the EuroBasket Women 2019, where they went 1–2 in Group play and advanced to the Final Round. They defeated Italy in the Qualification for Quarterfinals Round, but then lost to Spain in the Quarters. They finished in 8th place. They did not qualify for the FIBA World Cup in 2018. In August 2019, Andrei Kirilenko announced that they would not extend a new contract with Lange.

==== Australia ====
Lange was named to Sandy Brondello's coaching staff for the Opals in 2019.

=== Europe ===
==== BTV 1846 Wuppertal ====
Lange began his coaching career in Germany as an assistant coach with BTV 1846 Wuppertal. He spent two seasons with the team, and was a member of the coaching staff when they won the FIBA EuroLeague Championship in 1996.

==== BTV 1846/Gold-Zack Wuppertal ====
Lange became the head coach at BTV 1846/Gold-Zack Wuppertal in 1997 and spent five seasons with the organization until 2002. During his time there, Lange helped guide the team to five straight German Championships - from 1998 to 2002.

==== Mitteldeutscher Basketball Club ====
Lange switched over to the men's side of coaching and became an assistant at Mitteldeutscher BC for one season. During his short time there, the team was the FIBA EuroCup Winner in 2004.

==== Ros Casares Valencia ====
Lange was named the head coach of Ros Casares in 2004 and got them to the Supercup Championship in the same year.

==== UMMC Ekaterinburg ====
Lange became the head coach at the Russian powerhouse UMMC Ekaterinburg in 2012. During his tenure with UMMC, Lange led the team to five straight Russian Premier League championships (2013–18) and two FIBA EuroLeague titles (2013, 2016).

In January 2018, Lange departed as head coach from Ekaterinburg, just hours after they had defeated Nadezhda in a regular season victory.

=== College ===
==== Liberty ====
In 2005, Lange made the jump to the American collegiate level, when he was named Associate Head Coach at Liberty University. He was in charge of overseeing overall game management, strategy development, scouting, team and individual development as well as supervising the team's strength and conditioning program. Lange spent two season with Liberty until 2007.

=== WNBA ===
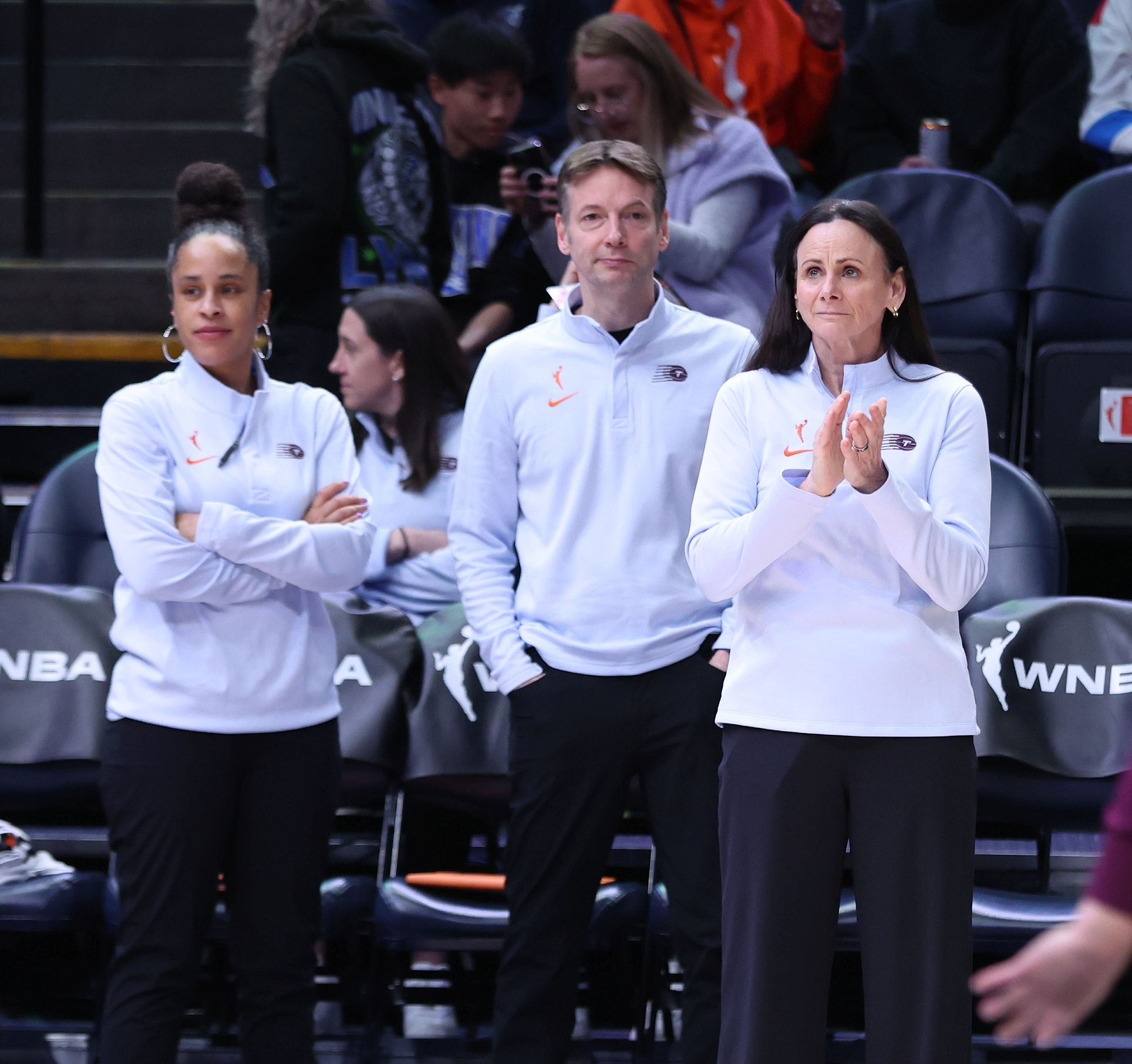
Lange (center) coaching the Toronto Tempo alongside head coach and wife Sandy Brondello (right), May 2026.

==== San Antonio Silver Stars ====
Lange made the jump to the professional level following his two season at Liberty. He was hired by the San Antonio Silver Stars of the WNBA in 2007. He was hired as assistant coach, while also being in-charge of video and player development. In 2010, Lange was promoted to Associate Head Coach, when Sandy Brondello was also promoted to Head Coach of the Stars.

==== Consultant ====
Lange has also served as a consultant for various WNBA teams, including the Phoenix Mercury and the Los Angeles Sparks. Both teams were teams where Brondello, his wife, was on staff.

==== Chicago Sky ====
In 2019, James Wade hired Lange to join his coaching staff in Chicago with the Sky. Wade had known Lange a long time, as they coached against and with each other over in Europe. Lange was also a coach in San Antonio for Wade's wife Edwige Lawson-Wade in 2010. Lange was in Chicago for three-seasons, including being a part of the 2021 WNBA Championship, which he won over his wife, Brondello.

==== New York Liberty ====
Lange reunited with his wife, Brondello, when she was hired by the New York Liberty in the off-season prior to the 2022 WNBA season. In their first season together since their days in San Antonio, Lange and Brondello helped guide the Liberty into the playoffs after a slow start to the season.

==== Toronto Tempo ====
In 2026, it was announced that Lange was named as the associate head coach for the Toronto Tempo for the team's inaugural season joining his wife, Brondello, who is acting as the team's head coach.

== Personal life ==
Lange is married to Sandy Brondello, the current head coach of the Toronto Tempo. They have two children, Brody and Jayda, together. The two met years ago in Germany when Brondello was playing and Lange was a young assistant coach on that team.

During the 2020 COVID bubble year that the league spent in Florida, the couple decided to not live together, as they were coaching for two separate teams at the time.
