= Charlie Wall-Andrews =

Canadian academic and music industry executive

- Education: PhD Toronto Metropolitan University; MA Ethnomusicology York University; MBA Ivey Business School
- Occupations: Assistant Professor, Executive Director
- Employer(s): Toronto Metropolitan University, SOCAN Foundation
- Known for: Scholar and advocate for inclusion and innovation in the creative industries
- Awards: Change Maker of the Year, Top 100 Most Powerful Women in Canada, King Charles III’s Coronation Medal
- Website: charliewallandrews.com

Charlie Wall-Andrews is a Canadian academic and music industry executive. She serves as an Assistant Professor in Creative Industries at Toronto Metropolitan University and the executive director of the SOCAN Foundation. Dr. Wall-Andrews is recognized for her work in advancing inclusion and innovation in the creative industries. She has created programs such as the Her Music Awards, Leadership Accelerator, the Equity X Production Program, and the Incubator for Creative Entrepreneurship.

== Early life and education ==
Wall-Andrews holds a PhD in Management from Ted Rogers School of Management at Toronto Metropolitan University, a Master of Arts in Ethnomusicology from York University, and an MBA from the Ivey Business School. She received the prestigious Pierre Elliott Trudeau Foundation Scholarship to conduct research on equity creation in highly inequitable settings and was the recipient of the Social Sciences and Humanities Research Council Doctoral Scholarship and received the Michael Smith Foreign Study Supplement to be a visiting researcher at Stanford University.

== Career ==
Wall-Andrews began her career as a music creator and has become a leader in Canada's cultural and creative industries. She has been the executive director of the SOCAN Foundation, where she has led various programs aimed at supporting diversity and inclusion in the arts. These include the Her Music Awards, the Equity X Production Program, the Creative Entrepreneur Incubator, and the Indigenous Music Residency Program. In 2025, she was invited by Saudi Crown Prince and Prime Minister Mohammed bin Salman to speak at the inaugural Cultural Investment Conference to share her expertise.

== Advocacy ==
Wall-Andrews is a strong advocate for diversity, equity, and inclusion in the arts. She has written numerous papers and articles on the topic and has been involved in initiatives that promote equity in creative industries. In 2024, she led two national research projects such as: Enablers and Barriers to Canada's Music Industry, The Value of Black Music in Canada, and empowerment of the Latin Music community in Canada.

== Awards and recognition ==
Wall-Andrews has been recognized for her contributions to the arts and nonprofit management. In 2025, she received the King Charles III’s Coronation Medal, which is awarded to those who have made a significant contribution to Canada. She has been named one of Canada's Top 100 Most Powerful Women and was included in Corporate Knights' Top 30 Under 30. In 2024 and 2025, she was honored as one of Billboard Canada's Women in Music Honourees and served as a judge for the 2024 CBC National Searchlight Competition. In 2025, she received the Change Maker of the Year at the Women in Music Canada Honours. Later that year, she was featured as in Power Players by Billboard Canada as a music industry executive making an impact.

== Board membership and fellowships ==
Wall-Andrews is a Legacy Fellow of the Edmond de Rothschild Foundations and serves as vice-chair of Music Canada's Advisory Council. She is also a board member of the Canada Council for the Arts, where she is serving a four-year term. Wall-Andrews is also on the Advisory Board for NXNE. In 2025, she was appointed to the International Advisory Board for the City of Rotterdam, which aimed to elevate cultural policy. Also, in 2025, Dr. Wall-Andrews is one of the delegated selected to attend the Global Fellowship Forum in Cape Town, South Africa to engage with leaders to discuss Leading in a Polarized World.
