= Toronto Tempo =

Women's National Basketball Association team in Toronto, Ontario

- 2026 Toronto Tempo season
- Conference: Eastern
- League: WNBA
- Established: 2026
- History: Toronto Tempo; 2026–present
- Arena: Coca-Cola Coliseum
- Location: Toronto, Ontario
- Team colours: Bordeaux, borealis blue, black, white
- President: Teresa Resch
- General manager: Monica Wright Rogers
- Head coach: Sandy Brondello
- Assistants: Olaf Lange; Ciara Carl; Brian Lankton; Sadie Edwards
- Ownership: Larry Tanenbaum (via Kilmer Sports Ventures); Serena Williams; Lilly Singh; Sukhinder Singh Cassidy; Geoff Molson; France Margaret Bélanger; Masai Ujiri; Kyle Lowry; Ayahna Cornish-Lowry; Olivia Melnyk; Anna Melnyk
- Website: tempo.wnba.com

The Toronto Tempo are a Canadian professional basketball team based in Toronto. The Tempo compete in the Women's National Basketball Association (WNBA) as a member of the Eastern Conference. The team plays its home games at Coca-Cola Coliseum. Beginning play in May 2026, they are the first WNBA team located outside of the United States and the first in Canada.

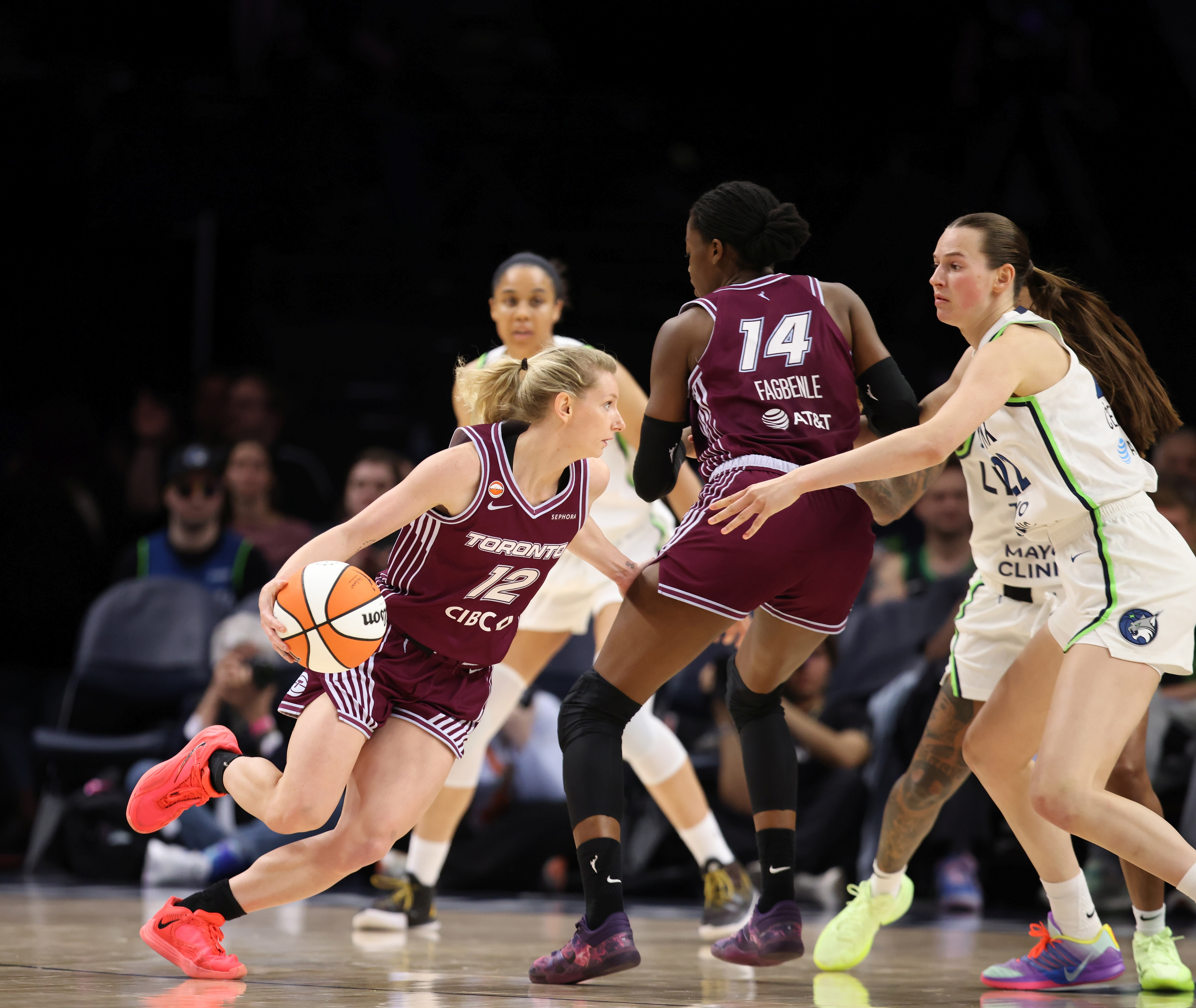
Toronto Tempo players in a pick and roll action on May 1, 2026, ahead of their inaugural 2026 WNBA season

== History ==
In May 2023, the WNBA held a preseason exhibition game between the Minnesota Lynx and Chicago Sky at Scotiabank Arena in Toronto; the sellout crowd and accompanying enthusiasm led to speculation on whether the city could host a women's team alongside the existing men's Toronto Raptors.

On May 10, 2024, reports emerged that the WNBA and Kilmer Group were negotiating for a Toronto-based expansion franchise. The WNBA officially announced the creation of the franchise on May 23, 2024. The team became the 14th in the WNBA and the first to be based outside the United States. The team is owned by Kilmer Sports Ventures, led by Toronto-based billionaire Larry Tanenbaum, who paid an expansion fee of $50 million USD for the franchise. Tanenbaum was a former minority owner and chairman of Maple Leaf Sports & Entertainment (MLSE), which owns fellow professional Toronto sports teams, the Toronto Maple Leafs and the Toronto Raptors among others. Tanenbaum originally pursued the WNBA venture through MLSE, though other members of the board turned it down. CBC News reported a source stating the WNBA expansion franchise is expected to play at Coca-Cola Coliseum, an 8,500-seat arena at Exhibition Place that has hosted most Toronto Marlies AHL games since 2005 and Toronto Sceptres PWHL games since 2024.

When approving the team, the WNBA board of governors voted 13–0 and the NBA board of governors voted 29–1, with only the New York Knicks voting against the expansion. At the time, the Knicks were in the process of suing the Toronto Raptors due to "alleged theft of proprietary information", before the suit was eventually voluntarily dismissed by both parties in 2025.

Early stage team members included Teresa Resch, who was named president of the franchise, Patrick Lee (chief financial officer), Lisa Ferkul (chief revenue officer), and Whitney Bell (chief marketing officer).

On December 4, 2024, the "Toronto Tempo" nickname was accidentally posted to the dropdown menu of the WNBA website; later that day, the Tempo logo was leaked on SportsLogos.net courtesy of an anonymous WNBA source. The next day, the Tempo name, logo, and colour scheme were officially unveiled by the team.

In February 2025, Monica Wright Rogers was hired as the first general manager for the Toronto Tempo. In May 2025, Eli Horowitz was hired as the assistant general manager and senior vice president of basketball strategy.

On March 3, 2025, American former professional tennis player Serena Williams was announced as a joint-owner of the team. In May 2025, Sukhinder Singh Cassidy and Lilly Singh joined the ownership group for the Tempo. On September 23, 2025, Geoff Molson and France Margaret Bélanger from Groupe CH, the ownership group of the Montreal Canadiens were announced as additional members of the Tempo's ownership group. Former Toronto Raptors president Masai Ujiri joined the ownership group in March 2026.

In January 2025, the team announced its first founding partner Sephora. In April 2025, the Tempo announced their founding partnership with Canadian Imperial Bank of Commerce.

In August 2025, the team announced that during the 2026 season it would play two regular season games at Rogers Arena in Vancouver. In September 2025, the Tempo also announced that an additional two regular season games during the 2026 season would be played at Bell Centre in Montreal.

The Toronto Tempo took their first steps towards building a roster on April 3rd, 2026 by selecting 11 players as part of the expansion draft. They selected Julie Allemand (Los Angeles Sparks) as their first pick (the 2nd pick of the draft after the Portland Fire). On April 13th, 2026 as part of the 2026 WNBA Draft Toronto selected Kiki Rice (6th), Teonni Key (22nd), Saffron Shiels (26th), and Charlise Dunn (36th).

Starting in April 2026, the Goldring Centre for High Performance Sport on the campus of University of Toronto will be the practice facility for the Tempo professional basketball team until a purpose-built facility by Exhibition Place is constructed to open by 2028.

On July 7, 2026, former Toronto Raptor player Kyle Lowry and his wife, Ayahna Cornish-Lowry joined the Tempo’s ownership group.

On August 18, 2026, the team revealed their mascots Dez the snapping turtle and Dot the Arctic hare during half-time against the Indiana Fever.

On November 21, 2026, minority owners of the Ottawa Senators Olivia Melnyk and Anna Melnyk joined the Tempo's ownership group.

=== Inaugural Season (2026–present) ===
The Toronto Tempo made its regular-season debut on May 8, 2026 against the Washington Mystics at Coca-Cola Coliseum in front of a sellout crowd of 8,210 in a loss to the Mystics 68–65. The game marked the first WNBA regular-season game played in Canada and the league's first game featuring a franchise based outside the United States. The Tempo recorded its first regular-season victory five days later, defeating the Seattle Storm 86–73 at home. As part of the franchise's role as Canada's first WNBA team, Toronto played regular-season home games in two other Canadian cities, Montreal and Vancouver. The team also played three games at the larger Scotiabank Arena in Toronto, home of the Toronto Raptors. The Tempo set a new WNBA regular season attendance record on July 10th, with 20,996 fans in attendance at the Bell Centre in Montreal in a game versus the Dallas Wings.Marina Mabrey tied the WNBA single-game scoring record with 53 points in a win against the Los Angeles Sparks on June 25, 2026.On July 31, 2026, the Tempo acquired forward Aneesah Morrow from the Connecticut Sun in exchange for the rights to Maria Kliundikova and a 2028 second-round draft pick.

The Tempo began the season with a 7–5 record before a long-term injury to Brittney Sykes, followed by injuries to several other core players. Nyara Sabally, Kiki Rice and Marina Mabrey all missed significant time and the four players appeared together for only 78 minutes over the course of the season.On August 23, 2026, they were reduced to a season low seven players available after an injury to Julie Allemand. They finished their inaugural regular season with an 11–33 record, placing sixth in the Eastern Conference. They tied the Connecticut Sun (Now Houston Comets) for the best odds in the 2027 WNBA Draft lottery with each team having a 32.9% chance to secure the number one overall pick.On November 15, 2026, the Tempo won the draft lottery, getting the number one overall pick in the 2027 WNBA Draft.

=== Toronto Tempo Performance Centre ===
On April 17, 2026, the Toronto Tempo announced plans for a new $100-million privately funded training facility in partnership with the City of Toronto. Located at Exhibition Place, near Coca-Cola Coliseum, the facility will include two WNBA-regulation basketball courts, locker rooms, sports medicine, recovery areas and other player support facilities. Under a 40 year lease for $1 annually, the facility will provide at least 2,200 hours of annual access for City of Toronto community recreation programs. It is expected to open by the start of the 2028 season.

=== Media ===
Beginning with the 2026 season, Bell Media became the WNBA's primary media partner in Canada under a multi-year deal. All Tempo games not selected for global streaming on Prime Video (one game in the 2026 season) are scheduled to air on TSN, with some games simulcast on CTV and streaming on Crave.

On September 20, 2026, ESPN premiered Setting the Tempo, a four-part documentary chronicling the creation and launch of the Toronto Tempo. The ESPN original features behind-the-scenes looks at the hiring of the front office, coach and building the roster among CBA uncertainty going into their first season.

== Coaches and staff ==
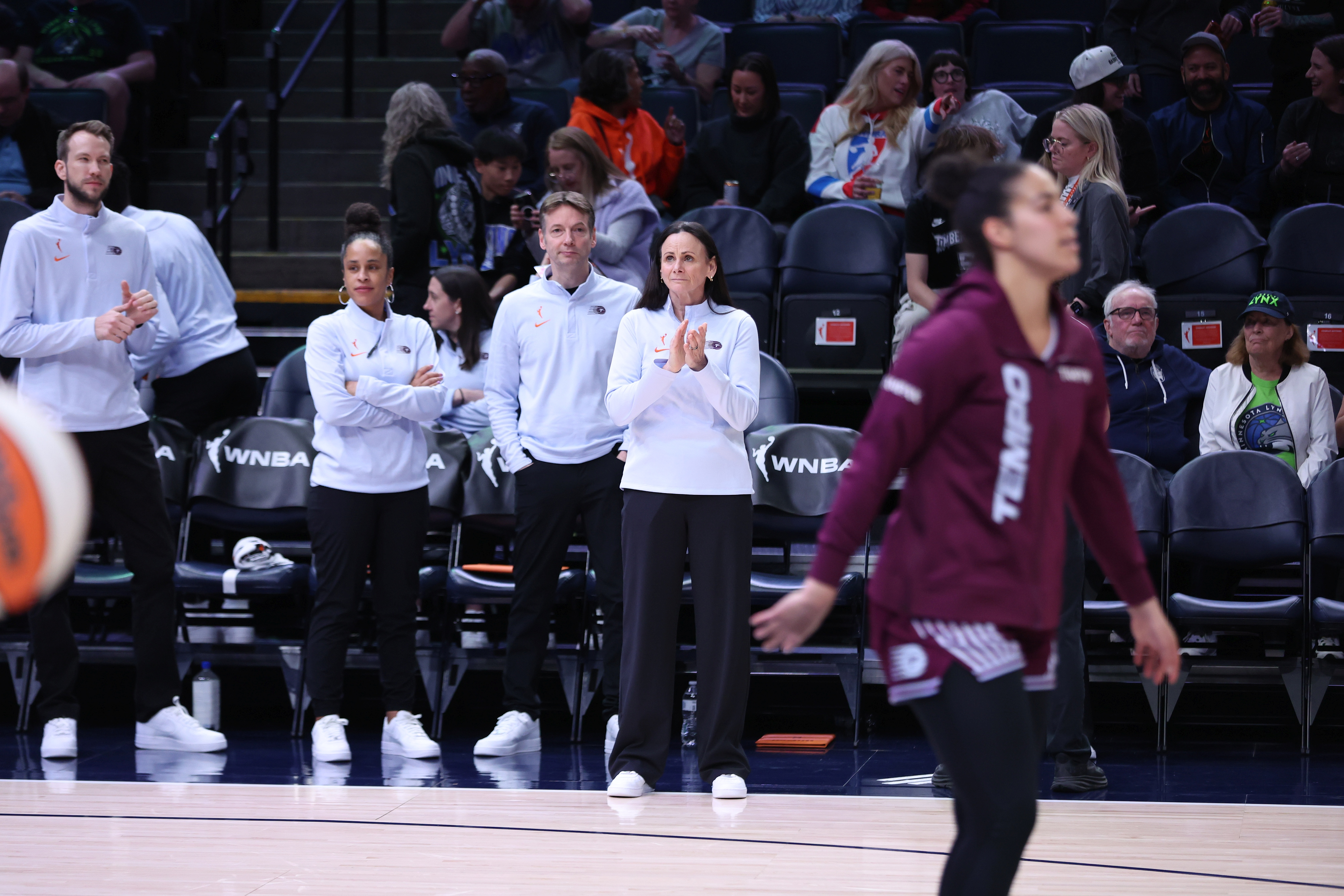
Tempo coaching staff, May 2026. From left to right: assistant head coaches Brian Lankton and Ciara Carl, associate head coach Olaf Lange, and head coach Sandy Brondello.

=== Head coaches ===
On November 4, 2025, the Tempo announced the hiring of Sandy Brondello as the team’s first Head Coach.

=== Assistant coaches ===
- Olaf Lange, Associate Head Coach
- Ciara Carl, Assistant Coach
- Carly Clarke, Assistant Coach
- Brian Lankton, Assistant Coach
- Sadie Edwards, Assistant Coach & Head Video Coordinator
- Justina King, Assistant Video Coordinator & Team Operations Support

=== General managers ===
- Monica Wright Rogers (2025–present)

== Season-by-season record & roster ==
Toronto Tempo
Season	Team	Conference		Regular Season			Playoff Results
Season	Team	Conference		W	L	PCT	Playoff Results
2026	2026	East	6th	11	33	.250	Did not qualify
Regular season				11	33	.250	0 Conference Champions
Playoffs				0	0	–	0 WNBA Championships

=== Current roster ===
Toronto Tempo roster
Players
Coaches

Pos.	No.	Nat.	Name	Height	Weight	DOB	From	Yrs
G	22	(Belgium)	Allemand, Julie	5' 8" (1.73m)	147 lb (67kg)	1996-07-07	Belgium	3
F	33	(France)	Bankole, Ornella	5' 11" (1.8m)		1997-10-17	France	R
C	5	(Poland)	Borkowska, Kamila	6' 7" (2.01m)		2002-07-26	Poland	R
F	10	(Spain)	Conde, María	6' 1" (1.85m)	152 lb (69kg)	1997-01-14	Florida State	R
C	14	(United Kingdom)	Fagbenle, Temi	6' 4" (1.93m)	180 lb (82kg)	1992-09-08	USC	4
C	6	(South Sudan)	Gakdeng, Maria	6' 3" (1.91m)		2003-06-09	North Carolina	R
G	00	(United States)	Green, Zaay	6' 2" (1.88m)		2000-03-25	Alabama	R
F	21	(United States)	Harrison, Isabelle	6' 3" (1.91m)	183 lb (83kg)	1993-09-27	Tennessee	7
F	2	(Lithuania)	Juškaitė, Laura	6' 2" (1.88m)	176 lb (80kg)	1997-09-22	Lithuania	R
F	7	(United States)	Key, Teonni	6' 4" (1.93m)	170 lb (77kg)	2003-07-10	Kentucky	R
G	3	(United States)	Mabrey, Marina (injured)	6' 1" (1.85m)	186 lb (84kg)	1996-09-14	Notre Dame	7
F	24	(United States)	Morrow, Aneesah (injured)	6' 1" (1.85m)	178 lb (81kg)	2003-02-02	LSU	1
G	11	(Canada)	Nurse, Kia	6' 0" (1.83m)	195 lb (88kg)	1996-02-22	Connecticut	6
G	1	(United States)	Rice, Kiki	5' 11" (1.8m)	166 lb (75kg)	2004-01-04	UCLA	R
C	8	(Germany)	Sabally, Nyara	6' 5" (1.96m)	204 lb (93kg)	2000-02-26	Oregon	3
G	20	(United States)	Sykes, Brittney (injured)	5' 9" (1.75m)	154 lb (70kg)	1994-02-07	Syracuse	8

Head coach
(Australia) Sandy Brondello
Assistant coaches
(United States) Ciara Carl (North Texas)
(Canada) Carly Clarke
(United States) Sadie Edwards (USC)
(Germany) Olaf Lange
(United States) Brian Lankton (Phoenix College)

Legend

- (C) Team captain
- (DP) Unsigned draft pick
- (FA) Free agent
- (S) Suspended
- Injured

WNBA roster page

East
ATL
CHI
CON
IND
NY
TOR
WAS
West
DAL
GS
LV
LA
MIN
PHO
POR
SEA
