= Larry Tanenbaum =

Canadian businessman

- Born: July 8, 1945 (age 81); Toronto, Ontario, Canada
- Education: Cornell University (BS)
- Board member of: Hockey Hall of Fame

Lawrence M. Tanenbaum OC (born 1945) is a Canadian businessman and co-owner of the Toronto Tempo. He is also a co-owner of Coca-Cola Canada Bottling, the bottler and distributor of Coca-Cola Company products in Canada. From 1996 to 2026, he was an owner of Maple Leaf Sports & Entertainment through his holding company Kilmer Sports Inc.

== Early life ==
Tanenbaum was born to a Jewish family, son of Max (owner of York Steel) and Anne Tanenbaum, and earned a Bachelor of Science degree in economics from Cornell University in 1968.

The family's patriarch, Abraham Tanenbaum, left Parczew, Congress Poland, north of Lublin, for New York in 1911. Two Toronto-bound friends from the same town persuaded Abraham to join them. Shortly after arriving in Toronto, Abraham was driving a horse and cart through residential and industrial areas of Toronto looking for scrap metal. By 1914, just before the war in Europe, Abraham had saved enough to bring his wife, Chippa Sura, and two young sons Joseph and Max to accompany him in Toronto. Abraham prospered and constructed the Runnymede Iron and Steel Company into a major steel fabrication company and real estate empire. His son, Max, who founded his own company, York Steel, had seven children, among them Larry, who studied economics at Cornell University.

== Business activities ==
=== Sports ===
Tanenbaum has had a long-standing interest in sports and entertainment. In 1991 he led an unsuccessful effort to bring an NBA franchise to Toronto. In 1996 he acquired an interest in the Toronto Maple Leafs hockey club and arena. In 1998 Tanenbaum was an active force in the acquisition of the Toronto Raptors basketball team and Air Canada Centre by the Toronto Maple Leafs, which together formed Maple Leaf Sports and Entertainment (MLSE). Tanenbaum's holding company Kilmer Sports Inc. once owned a 25% stake in MLSE. Through that ownership, Tanenbaum held roles as chair emeritus of MLSE, chairman of the board of the National Basketball Association, and a governor and member of the executive committee of the National Hockey League, the NBA, and Major League Soccer (Toronto FC professional soccer club, which MLSE also owns). He is a member of the board of the Hockey Hall of Fame in Toronto, Ontario.

In November 2023, Tanenbaum and OMERS announced that the latter had agreed to purchase 20% of Kilmer Sports (giving it an indirect 5% holding of MLSE) for US$400 million. Tanenbaum will continue in his management role of the company, with OMERS being a silent partner. In July 2026, Tanenbaum agreed to sell his share of MLSE to Rogers for $4.35 billion.

MLSE explored applying for a Toronto-based Women's National Basketball Association expansion franchise, but eventually decided against it. Instead, Tanenbaum's Kilmer Sports Ventures independently submitted an application for a WNBA expansion team for Toronto, which was granted by the league in May 2024. An expansion fee of US$50 million was paid for the franchise.

In June 2024 Kilmer Sports Ventures acquired AS Saint-Étienne, a French club freshly promoted back to Ligue 1, the top-level soccer league of France. Founded in 1933, Saint-Étienne is one of the country's most decorated teams, with ten Ligue 1 titles. Kilmer Sports Ventures cited the club's legacy, national following, and strong community role as reasons for the acquisition, with Larry Tanenbaum emphasizing its importance as both a sporting and cultural institution.

=== Beverages ===
In 2018, Tanenbaum, along with U.S. bottler Junior Bridgeman, became a co-owner of Coca-Cola Canada Bottling, the sole bottler and distributor of products from The Coca-Cola Company in Canada, through the acquisition of the previously corporate-owned Coca-Cola Refreshments Canada.

== Philanthropy ==
Tanenbaum's involvement in community associations includes the following: vice chair of Sinai Health System; co-chair of the Research Committee for the Lunenfeld-Tanenbaum Research Institute; vice-chair, Brain Canada; member, University Council, Cornell University; Honorary Board Member, Baycrest Centre for Geriatric Care; member of the advisory board, Montreal Neurological Institute; co-founder and board member, Tanenbaum Open Science Institute at MNI; member, Dean's advisory council, Schulich School of Business, York University; founding board member, executive committee member and member of the Global Leadership Council of Right to Play; founding member, Centre for Israel and Jewish Affairs; and co-chair, Tomorrow Campaign (UJA).

== Personal life ==
Tanenbaum is married. He has two daughters and one son.

== Honours and awards ==
In recognition of his contributions in the areas of philanthropy, volunteerism and sports, Tanenbaum was appointed an Officer of the Order of Canada on October 25, 2007.

In June 2012, he was awarded an honorary degree of Doctor of Laws, by St. Michael's College at the University of Toronto.

Sporting positions
Preceded by Allan Slaight	Toronto Raptors owner (under MLSE); 1998–2026	Succeeded by Rogers Communications (via MLSE)
First	Toronto Tempo owner 2026–present	Incumbent
