= Tallewal =

Village in Punjab, India

- Village
- Location in Punjab, India Tallewal (India)
- Coordinates: 30.4915°N 75.4155°E
- Country: India
- State: Punjab
- District: Barnala

Government
  - Body: Gram panchayat

Languages
  - Official: Punjabi
- Time zone: UTC+5:30 (IST)
- PIN: 148100

Tallewal is a village in the Barnala district of Punjab, India. Tallewal is about 22 km from its district Barnala. It is situated alongside National Highway 703 (India) and Sirhind Canal (Known as 'Tallewal Wali Nehar') is passed from the side of this village. It is one of the largest villages in Barnala block. It is a developing village and has a post office, a branch of Punjab National Bank.

Most of the residents are farmers by occupation. The people of the village are very competitive and progressive. Many of its residents have migrated to Canada, U.K., Australia. People from various religions and communities live in the village, therefore, The Village has three main Gurdwara's, Shivdwala, and a Masjid. Gurudwara Sahib (Nehar wale) is well-known in Barnala District. The head of the Gurudwara is Sant Baba Karnail Singh Ji. They build the tallest Nishan-e-Khalsa at Anandpur Sahib. Sangrand, Puranmashi Purnima, Masaya and Gurupurabs are main events here.
