= Drag Racer (song) =

1976 song by the Doug Wood Band

"Drag Racer" is a 1976 rock instrumental song by the Doug Wood Band.

It was written and performed by Doug Wood who played all the instruments and recorded himself on a multi-track tape recorder. The song was later picked as the theme song for the BBC's snooker coverage.

It was released as part of the BBC Snooker Themes EP, released on BBC Records in 1984 (RESL 144), and is credited to the Douglas Wood Group. This version, however, differs slightly from the original 1976 recording, as sounds of snooker balls have been added to the start of the track. For this reason, the copyright date is shown on the record as 1982.

The original track, without those modifications, can be found as track 6 on the CD The Great Sporting Experience, published by EMI in 1998 (CD GOAL 1). This is credited to Doug Wood Group, licensed from Studio G. BBC Sports later discontinued use of this particular track as the main theme of snooker coverage. Instead, it had been heavily updated and remixed a number of times. The 2003 version was entitled "147 Lockdown" by Sheldon Southworth, possibly in reference to British speed garage act 187 Lockdown. A later version was by Timo Baker of T Minus 50.

As of the 2008 World Snooker Championship, the BBC returned to using the original version of "Drag Racer", during session breaks on their Interactive service. It is played over a caption of forthcoming matches. Although the entire track was used initially, tournaments after this date feature the track shortened, and edited into a continuous loop.

== Critical reception ==
Sports journalists have mentioned the track as the "best sports theme tune ever" and as having the "most evocative guitar riff of all time".
