= TheBoardlist =

Online talent marketplace

theBoardlist
- Company type: Benefit corporation
- Founded: July 15, 2015; 11 years ago
- Headquarters: Atherton, California, U.S.
- Area served: United States, Europe
- Founder: Sukhinder Singh Cassidy
- Website: www.theboardlist.com

theBoardlist is an online talent marketplace that connects CEOs seeking qualified board candidates with women who are peer-endorsed for service on private and public company boards. theBoardlist was founded by technology executive and entrepreneur Sukhinder Singh Cassidy in July 2015. theBoardlist is the first initiative of Singh Cassidy's #ChoosePossibility Project, a Benefit Corporation headquartered in Atherton, California, in the United States.

theBoardlist's mission is to increase the number of women on company boards, starting with the tech industry. Research by theBoardlist shows that 75-78% of private tech companies do not have a woman on the board of directors.

theBoardlist has three types of users: 1) CEOs, founders and investors who search theBoardlist database for qualified board candidates, 2) CEOs, senior executives and board members who endorse women candidates on theBoardlist, and, 3) women who have been endorsed as candidates on theBoardlist. As of April 2016, theBoardlist has over 80 active board searches, and over 500 executives who have endorsed more than 1,100 women leaders for private and public technology company board service.

theBoardlist is supported in part by its sponsors Silicon Valley Bank, Wilson Sonsini Goodrich & Rosati and Reed Smith LLP, and its corporate partners eBay and Marketo.

== History ==
In May 2015, Singh Cassidy published an open letter, titled “Tech Women Choose Possibility”, challenging the tech community to increase the rate of progress for women in the industry by leveraging its wealth of existing female talent. The letter was co-signed by 59 female technology entrepreneurs and investors. Singh Cassidy based the letter on her own experiences as a tech entrepreneur and research she conducted on 230 female founders and CEOs of technology companies.

Based on her research and the positive response the open letter received from the tech community, Singh Cassidy realized there is an opportunity to increase the number of women on tech company boards by making it easier for CEOs to identify and connect with qualified female candidates. She launched theBoardlist (beta) on July 15, 2015.

When it launched, theBoardlist included the names of over 600 women who had been endorsed by 50 investors and CEOs in the tech industry, from companies including Accel Partners, Greylock Partners, Twitter, Lyft and Box.

On October 20, 2015, theBoardlist announced that it had facilitated its first placement of a woman to the board of a private tech company.

On February 2, 2016, theBoardlist left beta with a public launch and new website at www.theboardlist.com. At the same time as the public launch in the U.S., theBoardlist announced its beta launch in Europe
