= Drag Race Eliminator =

1986 video game

- Publisher: Family Software
- Writer: Bob Kodadek
- Platforms: Commodore 64, IBM PC
- Release: 1986
- Genre: Racing
- Modes: Single-player, multiplayer

Drag Race Eliminator is a video game written by Bob Kodadek and published by Family Software in 1986 for the Commodore 64 and in 1988 for IBM PC compatibles. It was the first drag racing game for a personal computer.

== Gameplay ==
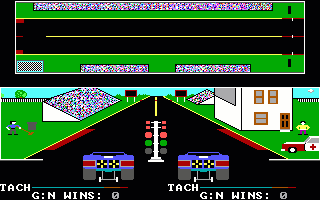
IBM PC version

This video game is a two-player, drag racing program with timing accuracy to one thousandth of a second. This simulation of professional drag racing included five classes of NHRA competition, including Top Fuel Dragsters, Top Alcohol Dragsters, Top Fuel Funny Cars, Top Alcohol Funny Cars, and Pro Stock. Race against the computer or another player. The timing system used a .400 Pro Tree with reported reaction times, elapsed times, and vehicle miles per hour. The outcome of every race was determined by the driver, not random data. Supported joysticks and keyboard for input.

Drag Race Eliminator was ported over to the IBM PC and compatibles in 1987 and became one of the longest selling racing games in the history of personal computers..

== See also ==
- Dragster, 1980 game for the Atari 2600
