= Harry Rosen =

Canadian businessman (1931–2023)

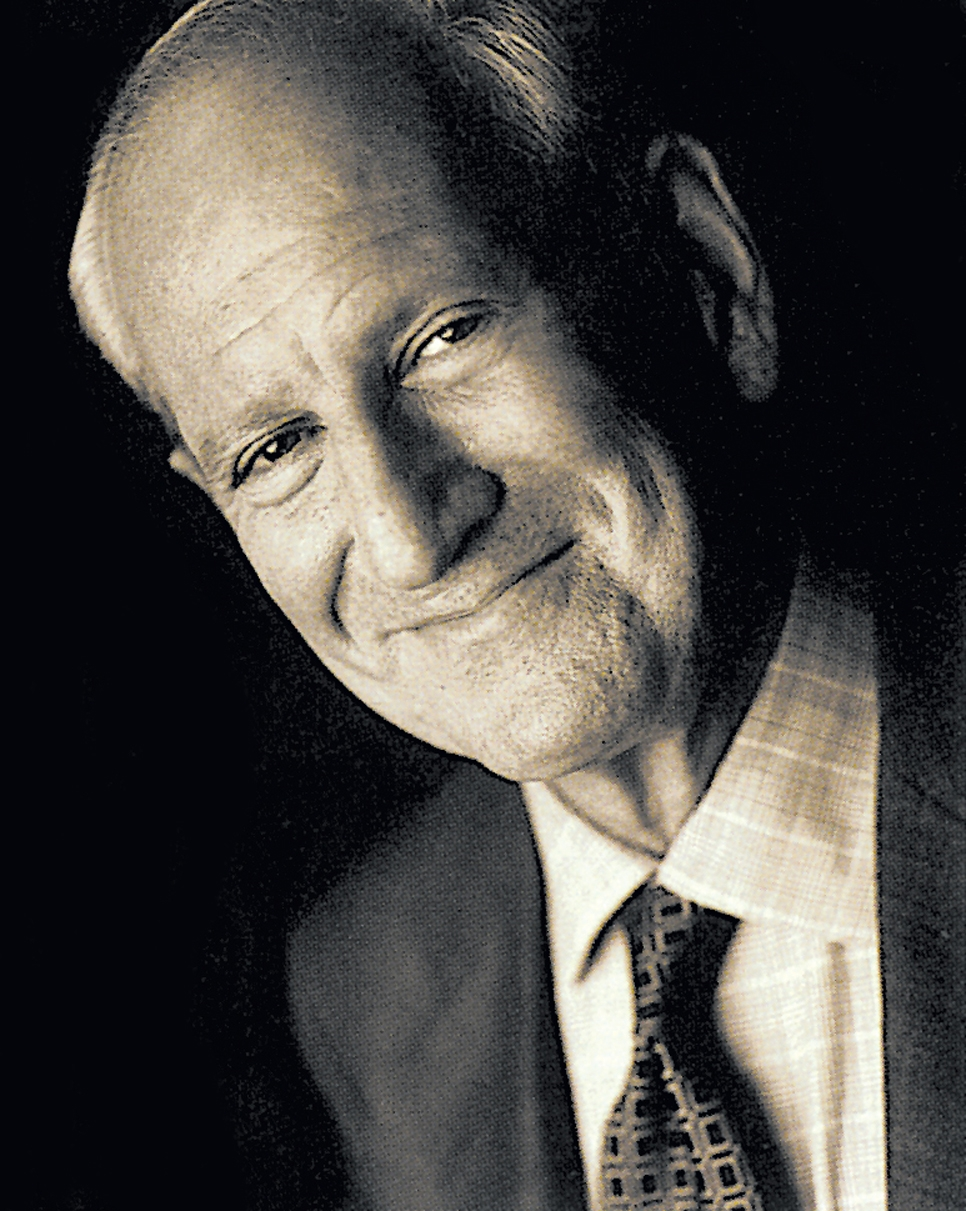

Harry Rosen CM (August 27, 1931 – December 24, 2023) was the founder and executive chairman of the Canadian luxury men's wear store Harry Rosen Inc., which in 2015 was Canada's largest upscale menswear retailer.

== Early life ==
Born and raised in Toronto, Rosen lived for a short time in Callander, Ontario. As a teenager, he found a job at a men's haberdashery shop. There he learned about the composition of clothing and, more importantly, about men's shopping habits.

After dropping out of high school he borrowed $500 and opened a men's clothing store.

== Career ==
With help from a family friend, he borrowed $500 and opened what would become Harry Rosen Inc., on February 4, 1954, in Cabbagetown, Toronto, with his brother Lou.

In 2016, Rosen was presented with a Fashion Visionary Award by Fashion Group International.

== Personal life ==
Rosen was married to his wife, Evelyn, for over 60 years. They had 4 children, 9 grandchildren, and 6 great-grandchildren. He died on December 24, 2023, at the age of 92.

=== Philanthropy ===
Rosen was active in the Canadian Paraplegic Association, Corporate Fund for Breast Cancer, Cancer Care Fund, Mount Sinai Friends for Life Campaign, Ryerson University board of governors, George Brown College board of governors, and the University of Western Ontario board of governors. He served a three-year term as campaign chairman for the Canadian Cancer Society, Metropolitan Toronto.

In 2004, he served on the Mount Sinai Hospital board of governors, Ryerson B.Com program in retailing advisory board, and on the cabinet of Major Individual Gifts for the United Way of Canada.

He appeared in a promotional campaign for the Centre for Addiction and Mental Health to promote services for those affected by addiction and mental health issues in the Toronto area.

In April 2010 he was honoured at a fundraising event for the University Health Network called "Hats Off To Harry."

== Awards ==
- 1987 — Retail Marketer of the Year by the Retail Council of Canada
- 2001 — Retail Council of Canada's Lifetime Achievement Award
- 2003 — Honorary Doctorate in Commerce, Ryerson University
- 2004 — Order of Canada
- 2005 — Pitti Immagine Uomo Award from the Italian fashion community
