= XMG Studio =

Canadian mobile games developer

XMG Studio Inc.
- Industry: Mobile gaming
- Founded: 2009; 17 years ago
- Founder: Ray Sharma
- Defunct: June 2017
- Headquarters: Toronto, Canada

XMG Studio was a mobile game developer based in Toronto, Canada. The company was founded by Ray Sharma in 2009. XMG developed games on iOS, Android and Windows Phone platforms. These games included: Fashion Star Boutique and Drag Racer World, and co-produced/licensed projects including Degrassi and Ghostbusters: Paranormal Blast.

XMG partnered with mobile games publisher DeNA to bring selected games to DeNA's mobile social game network. In 2012, XMG collaborated with Shaftesbury Films and its digital media division Smokebomb Entertainment to create an app-based video series known as "Totally Amp'd." XMG also worked with Sony and MuchMusic to develop the Degrassi and Ghostbusters - Paranormal Blast apps. One year later, in 2013, XMG partnered with startup company Seeds to help provide microloans to female entrepreneurs in developing countries through mobile gaming.

XMG created The Great Canadian Appathon, a 48-hour coding competition for college students which held its last competition in 2014. The studio has been inactive on all social media since late December 2016. In late June 2017, XMG Studio was acquired by Highmark Interactive in order to develop games to aid in recovery from traumatic brain injuries.
