= Bombay Company =

American furniture and home accessories retailer

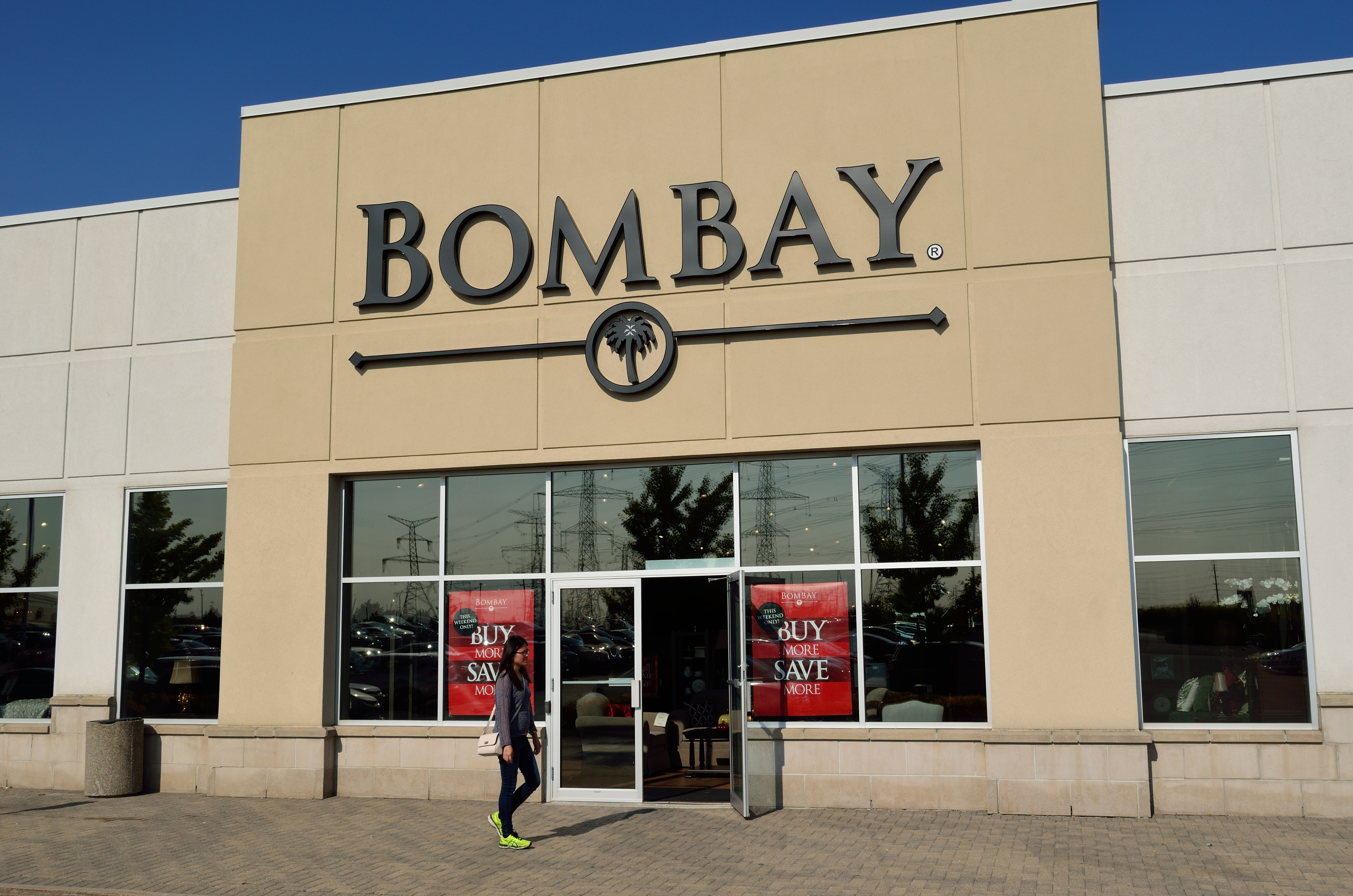
A Bombay Company store in Canada

The Bombay Company is an American furniture and home accessories retailer owned (since 2021) by an undisclosed LLC. At one time a chain of over 500 stores headquartered in Fort Worth, Texas, Bombay Company was relaunched in 2012 as an online store. After its owners arranged a new licensing deal, a second online re-launch was planned for the High Point Market in April 2018. However, by March 2019, the online sales function of their website was still not active.

== History ==
The Bombay Company was founded in 1978 by Brad Harper in New Orleans as a mail-order company and Canadian operations were allocated to his good friend Greg McGroarty. Harper later opened two retail stores in New Orleans. In 1980, Harper sold the U.S. operating rights and established overseas supply channels to the Fort Worth, Texas-based holding company Tandy Brands, Inc., which is publicly traded on NASDAQ.

In 1981, Tandy Brands purchased the Canadian rights from Robert Nourse, though Nourse continued to manage the Canadian operations. In 1983, Nourse moved to the United States and assumed responsibility for retail operations.

The Bombay Company filed for Chapter 11 bankruptcy protection on September 20, 2007. The company was sold to Gordon Brothers and Hilco, two liquidation companies that sold off the remaining inventory. As of January 21, 2008, all U.S. retail stores were liquidated and closed. In February 2008, Hilco, and Gordon Brothers purchased all intellectual capital of the Bombay Company, including the Bombay Company website, and created Bombay Brands, a company that will sell Bombay merchandise through other retail outfits. Some Bombay Original merchandise can be seen at Value City Furniture. In September 2010, approximately a dozen pieces of Bombay merchandise have also been made available for purchase in the U.S. through QVC and QVC.COM.

Bombay's Canadian operations were purchased by the B&C Group, which operates the Benix and Bowring retail banners in Canada. Bombay Canada is now owned by Fluid Brands Inc. Toronto based retail mogul Fred Benitah owner of Fluid Brands Inc. also owns Bowring Brothers, Canadian home decor retail chain.

In December 2009, William S. Hollands was named chief merchant overseeing the Bombay Company operating unit, which manages the U.S. licensing agreement with Bombay Brands LLC, during its re-emergence as a retail brand in the United States.

In 2011, Bombay was purchased by Hermes-Otto International, a subsidiary of Otto.

In 2014, Bombay & Co. filed for creditor protection under the Companies' Creditors Arrangement Act but promised to continue operations normally as it restructures. In November 2018, the Canadian operations of Bombay & Co., owned by Fluid Brands, Inc., were seeking creditor protection for the second time in four years, with more than $50 million in debt. It was eventually announced that all remaining locations would close before the end of the year.

In 2021, Bombay Company was sold to an undisclosed recipient.

In 2024, the company brand remains visible in the public domain, Bombay is the registered trademark of GHP Group, LLC.
