= Robert Nourse =

Robert E.M. Nourse is an entrepreneur and former president and CEO of The Bombay Company.

== Career ==
Bob Nourse purchased The Bombay Company of Canada, which was a single store at the time, in 1979. The Bombay Company grew to 450 stores with net sales of US$317 million for 1994. Nourse guided The Bombay Company to its successful listing on the New York Stock Exchange in 1993. Later that year, Inc. Magazine voted him Entrepreneur of the Year, calling the firm "America's hottest company."

After a decline in sales, Nourse was fired as CEO of Bombay on September 5, 1996, with Chairman Carson Thompson attributing the change to "a culmination of a lack of performance over a period of time."

== Awards ==
- 1993 Inc. Magazine voted him the Entrepreneur of the Year
- 1994 Ivey Business Leader of the Year
