= The Great Canadian Appathon =

The Great Canadian Appathon (GCA) was a 48-hour game design and development competition open to Canadian college and university students. Students attempted to design, develop and program a working mobile game within the restrictions of an annually changing game 'theme'. Individuals, or teams of up to four students, worked for 48-hours in designated 'HUBS' set up at participating universities and colleges, to submit their games for a variety of prizes. A number of studios have been founded on the prize money won at the Great Canadian Appathon. This includes Edmonton based 1st place Team Masheen, and Bitshift Games.

== Progress ==
	GCA (March 2011)	GCA^{2} (October 2011)	GCA^{3} (September 2012)
Provinces	4	8	10
Colleges and Universities	7	21	39
Teams	94	125	149
Students	296	410	521
Games	54	80	124

== Judging criteria ==
All the submitted games by GCA participants were evaluated by game development senior staff on criteria such as the degree of innovation, the fun and entertainment factor, the level of art and design polish as well as stability to determine the winners.

== History ==
=== 11 March – 13 March 2011 ===
Place	Team	HUB	Game
Winner 1	Team Masheen	Northern Alberta Institute of Technology & University of Alberta	Super Punch
Winner 2	Team Sheldon	University of British Columbia	Valley Raid
Winner 3	Resistor5	McGill University & Concordia University	Plasmium

=== 30 September – 2 October 2011 ===
Place	Team	HUB	Game
Winner 1	Drop Table Teams	Concordia University	Trace Racer
Winner 2	Resistor5	McGill University	Ludicrous Archery
Winner 3	Team ABXYZ	Carleton University	Portal Bow

=== 28 September – 30 September 2012 ===
Place	Team	HUB	Game
Winner 1	Team Heisenberg	Carleton University	Daylight Saving
Winner 2	Team Unistd	University of Toronto	Devourer of Worlds
Winner 3	Team Grade-F	Polytechnique Montreal	Zombyte
