= Harry Rosen Inc. =

Canadian menswear store chain

- Type: Privately held company
- Industry: Retail
- Founded: 1954 (Toronto, Ontario, Canada)
- Founder: Harry Rosen
- Headquarters: Toronto, Ontario, Canada
- Key people: Larry Rosen (Chairman / CEO)
- Products: High-end menswear and accessories
- Website: http://www.harryrosen.com/

Harry Rosen Inc. is a Canadian luxury retail chain founded by Harry Rosen in 1954 in Toronto. A privately owned company, Harry Rosen accounted for 40% of the Canadian market in high-end menswear in 2008.

== Stores ==
Founded by Harry Rosen in 1954 as a single 500-square-foot (46 m^{2}) store in Cabbagetown, Toronto, Harry Rosen now operates stores in Toronto (Mink Mile (Bloor Street), Yorkdale Shopping Centre, Toronto Eaton Centre, First Canadian Place, Sherway Gardens); Mississauga (Square One Shopping Centre); Ottawa (Rideau Centre); Winnipeg (Polo Park); Montreal (Les Cours Mont-Royal); Laval (Carrefour Laval); Edmonton (West Edmonton Mall); Calgary (The Core Shopping Centre, Chinook Centre); and Vancouver (Pacific Centre). There are outlet stores at Vaughan Mills in Vaughan, Heartland Town Centre in Mississauga, McArthurGlen Designer Outlet Vancouver Airport in Richmond, British Columbia and at Tsawwassen Mills in Delta, British Columbia.

== Brands ==
Harry Rosen stores offer several collections of fine menswear labels, including Armani, Brioni, Hugo Boss, Burberry, Canali, Dolce & Gabbana, Kiton and Ermenegildo Zegna.

== History ==
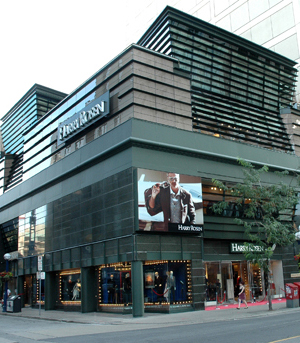
The Harry Rosen flagship store in Toronto on 82 Bloor Street West

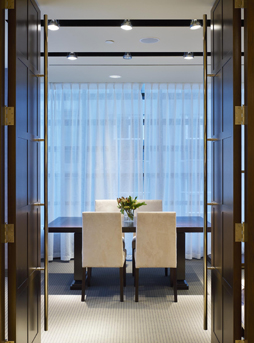
Private shopping room on the 4th floor of the Harry Rosen flagship store on 82 Bloor Street West

After working in a clothing store, Harry Rosen and his brother Lou opened a small made-to-measure store on Toronto’s Parliament Street with a $500 down payment. By 1961, success allowed them to relocate to larger premises closer to their clientele on Richmond Street in Toronto’s Financial District. With little retailing in this area, skeptics criticized the move, but the store soon becomes a destination for customers from across Toronto, Canada, and the United States.

Rosen credited much of his early success to Stann Burkhoff. This customer of his offered to create advertisements in exchange for two suits - one for him and one for his art director, Reid Bell. Burkhoff and Bell developed the extremely successful "Ask Harry" campaign. This campaign featured provocative text with simple, yet eye-catching, graphics in a Canadian national newspaper, The Globe and Mail.

Under Rosen's direction, the company "spends more than any Canadian retailer on its employee training...on the nuances of designer fashion, including the art of 'clothesmanship' – that is, determining the right garment for a man's body shape". Staff are also provided training on how "to manage client lists, how to assess a client's needs, how men shop in general, and how to build and maintain long-term relationships with clients". Consequently, the stores have a large number of long-term employees.

National growth began in 1981, when Harry Rosen opened the first store outside of Toronto at West Edmonton Mall. During this time, Harry Rosen began signing exclusive deals with top designers in Europe and the United States to sell their menswear in Canada. Many top designers still sell exclusively at Harry Rosen, with Tom Ford as the most recent addition.

In 1987, Harry Rosen opened a three-level, 32,000 sq ft (3,000 m^{2}). flagship store on Toronto’s Bloor Street. The store became known for its exclusive collections of fine menswear. That same year, The Retail Council of Canada presented Harry Rosen with its first Retail Marketer of the Year Award. Harry Rosen then introduced the award-winning newspaper ad campaign featuring such celebrities as David Cronenberg, Norman Jewison, Christopher Plummer, Remy Shand, Rick Mercer and more in 1996.

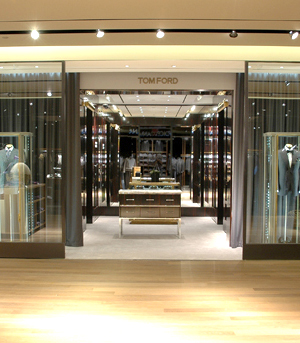
Tom Ford shop

Larry Rosen, Harry’s eldest son, joined the company in 1984, and after stints in store operations and buying, he became president and chief operating officer in 1997. Larry became chairman and chief executive officer in 2010, succeeding Harry who remained with the company as an advisor until his death in December 2023.

In 1997, Harry magazine was launched. With two issues a year, this men’s lifestyle magazine covers fashion advice and offers readers guidance in many areas of their life.

In the fall of 2008, Harry Rosen unveiled an expansion of the Bloor Street flagship location in Toronto that represented the largest capital investment ever made by the company. This major storewide renovation added two new stories to the building, providing five floors of retail space within 50,000 square feet (4,600 m^{2}). The chain’s flagship store at TD Square in Calgary is also doubling its size, and a second store was added in suburban Calgary at Chinook Centre in 2010.

Harry Rosen began selling merchandise online on May 15, 2009 via its website. Shipping is limited to Canadian addresses.

Harry Rosen permanently closed its flagship at 82 Bloor Street West on September 12, 2026 after nearly four decades at the address to open a new location less than 200 metres away at 153 Cumberland Street.
