= List of University of Western Ontario people =

This is a list of notable individuals associated with the University of Western Ontario, including graduates, former students, professors, and researchers.

== Alumni ==
=== Academics and scholars ===
- M. Shahid Alam – economist
- U. Aswathanarayana – honorary director of the Mahadevan International Centre for Water Resources Management, India
- George Ayittey – Ghanaian economist, author and president of the Free Africa Foundation in Washington DC, professor at American University
- Larry Bourne – professor emeritus of urban geography and planning at University of Toronto
- Stephen Dempster – professor emeritus of religious studies at Crandall University
- Robert C. Dynes – physicist, former president of the University of California
- Frances Egan – professor of philosophy at Rutgers University
- Mary E. Hofstetter – arts administrator and educator
- Peter Howitt – professor of economics and Nobel laureate (2025)
- Raffi Indjejikian – professor of accounting, Stephen M. Ross School of Business, University of Michigan
- Charles Jago – academic, university administrator
- Gabriel Leung – physician and epidemiologist, current dean of the Li Ka Shing Faculty of Medicine at the University of Hong Kong
- J. Carson Mark – mathematician
- Mark Mullins – executive director, Fraser Institute
- Leola Neal – psychologist, first female president of the Ontario Psychological Association
- Hart E. Posen – Richard G. and Julie J. Diermeier Professor in Business at the University of Wisconsin-Madison
- Andrew Price-Smith – Colorado College political science professor
- Philip Reny – economist, Chair of the Department of Economics at the University of Chicago
- Ervin Sejdic – data scientist and engineering professor at the University of Pittsburgh
- Vandana Shiva (Ph.D. Philosophy) – philosopher, environmentalist, eco feminist
- Michael Walker – economist
- Julia M. Wright— professor of English, Dalhousie University

=== Science, technology, and medicine ===
- Robert Arntfield, Canadian intensivist and medical educator
- Roberta Bondar (M.Sc. 1971 Experimental Pathology) – astronaut
- Donald Charlton Bradley – inorganic chemist
- Sudi Devanesen – physician, professor of medicine
- Charles George Drake – Canadian Medical Hall of Fame neurosurgeon
- Melvyn Goodale – neuroscientist
- Jennifer Gunter – OB/GYN and author
- L. Seale Holmes – dermatologist, radiologist, politician and noted philatelist
- Kelly Metcalfe – cancer scientist and professor
- Donald Rix – pathologist
- Graeme N. Smith— obstetrician, medical researcher, and academic
- Gavin C. E. Stuart— professor, former Dean of Medicine, and former Vice-Provost Health, UBC Faculty of Medicine
- Michael Stuart – Mayo Clinic sports physician and orthopedic surgeon
- Bjarni Tryggvason – astronaut

=== Media and arts ===
==== Journalism and publishing ====
- Thalia Assuras (B.Sc. 1980, M.A. 1981 Journalism) – CBC and CBS journalist
- Cameron Bailey – film critic and Toronto International Film Festival programmer
- Perrin Beatty (1970) – former president, CBC
- Lisa Bowes – sports anchor, CTV Calgary
- Andrea Canning (B.A. 1994 Psychology) – ABC News correspondent
- Nicole Dunsdon (M.A. 1995 Journalism) – the last person to win the Miss Canada competition before it was cancelled in 1992
- Uche Eze (B.Sc Business Administration 2006) —Nigerian blogger and founder of BellaNaija
- Avis Favaro – BA Honours, M.A Arts/Journalism 1982, performance degree Piano Western Conservatory of Music 1982; health journalist, Global News and CTV National News
- Brendan Fernandes – artist
- Scott Feschuk – speechwriter, humorist and former newspaper journalist
- Elliotte Friedman (1993) – sports reporter, host, Hockey Night in Canada
- Anthony Germain – CBC radio and television reporter and anchor
- Jennifer Hedger (B.A. 1998 Theatre Arts/English) – sports reporter for TSN
- Heather Hiscox (M.A. 1987 Journalism) – CBC news anchor
- Penn Kemp (B.A. 1966, CertEd 1968) – poet and playwright
- Sam Maggs (B.A. 2010 English Language & Literature) – author, entertainment journalist, and comic book and video game writer
- Wendy Metcalfe (B.A.) – newspaper journalist and editor
- Kevin Newman (B.A. 1981 Political Science) – anchor of Global National
- Carol Off (B.A. 1981) – television and radio journalist
- Kevin Quinn – sportscaster, Rogers Sportsnet
- Scott Russell (B.A. 1980 History, B.Ed. 1981, M.A. 1985 Journalism) – CBC commentator, Hockey Night in Canada and figure skating
- Morley Safer – host of 60 Minutes (did not graduate)
- Dan Shulman (B.Sc. 1989 Actuarial Science) – sportscaster for ESPN
- Steve Simmons – sports journalist, Toronto Sun
- Christine Simpson (1985) – sports reporter, Rogers Sportsnet
- Rachel Sklar – lawyer, CNN commentator, and media blogger
- Paul Wells (B.A. 1989 Political Science) – journalist and pundit, columnist for Maclean's

==== Film, television and theatre ====
- Bryan Baeumler (B.A. 1996) – award-winning host of Disaster DIY and House of Bryan
- Shirley Barrie – playwright
- Greg Brady (B.A. Political Science 1993) – host of Brady and Lang in the Morning on Sportsnet 590, The Fan
- Steve Byers – actor, Falcon Beach
- Nancy Dolman (Philosophy) – actress and wife of Martin Short
- Max Ferguson (B.A. 1946) – radio personality
- Olivia Ferney – social media influencer and travel agent
- David Furnish (H.B.A. 1985) – filmmaker and husband of Sir Elton John
- Tomson Highway (B. Mus. 1975, B.A. 1976) – playwright
- Juggan Kazim (B.A. 2002 Media, Information & Technoculture and Sociology) – actress, model, television personality
- Alexander Knox – Academy Award-nominated and Golden Globe Award-winning actor (did not graduate)
- Simu Liu (H.B.A. 2011) – Canadian-Chinese actor, writer, and stuntman
- Sarah Richardson (B.A. Visual Arts 93) – interior designer, HGTV series Sarah's House and Sarah 101, Design Inc.
- Kelly Rowan (1989) – actress, The O.C.
- Deepak Sethi (B.Sc. 2002 Computer Science) – television writer known for Family Guy
- David Shore – screenwriter and creator of television show House
- Rob Stewart — filmmaker, conservationist, and creator of Sharkwater
- Alan Thicke (1967) – actor, Growing Pains
- Kelly Thornton (B.A., did not finish) – theatre director
- Al Waxman (B.A. 1957) – actor

==== Music, fine arts and architecture ====
- Simona Atzori (B.A. 2001 Visual Arts) – dancer, artist, born without arms
- John Davis Barnett – librarian, curator
- Basia Bulat (B.A. 2006 English) – musician
- Bryan Lee O'Malley – Cartoonist, writer, creator of Scott Pilgrim
- Jack Chambers – artist
- Todd Clark – lead singer of the Toronto-based rock group Pilot Speed, formally known as Pilate, songwriter, record producer
- Duncan Coutts (1993) – musician, Our Lady Peace
- Eric Ethridge – country pop singer, songwriter
- Jonita Gandhi – playback singer
- Elaine Goble (B.A. 1977) – visual artist
- Garth Hudson – organist, The Band
- Stephan Moccio (B.Mus. 1994) – musician, singer/songwriter, composer, 2010 Vancouver Games performer
- Adrianne Pieczonka (B.Mus. 1985) – soprano opera singer
- Zameer Rizvi (B.Eng. 1981 Electrical Engineering)
- Michael Schade (B. Mus. 1888) – tenor opera singer
- Mike Turner – guitarist/producer, formerly of Our Lady Peace
- Stephen Willis – musicologist
- Don Wright – composer, musician and educator

=== Business ===
- Thomas Bailey – founder of Janus Capital Group, USA
- Geoff Beattie – president and CEO, Woodbridge
- Henry Cheng – chairman & executive director of NWS Holdings and New World Development
- Eleanor Clitheroe-Bell (1977) – former businesswoman, Anglican priest
- George Cope – president, CEO, BCE Inc., Bell Canada
- Michael Copeland – president and CEO of the Toronto Argonauts, previously with Boston Consulting Group and Deloitte Consulting
- Matthew Corrin – founder and CEO, Freshii
- Liane Davey (1993) – business consultant, public speaker, New York Times bestselling business author
- Brian Ferriman – music industry executive
- Shuman Ghosemajumder – technologist, author
- Stephen K. Gunn – CEO, co-founder of Sleep Country Canada
- Richard M. Ivey (H.B.A. 1947) – businessman, philanthropist
- C.B. "Bud" Johnston (H.B.A. 1954) (MBA 1957) (dean, 1978–1989; retired, 1997) – all at UWO
- Moez Kassam (B.A. 2002) – founder of Anson Group
- Jodi Kovitz – founder of #movethedial
- Arkadi Kuhlmann – chairman of ING Direct
- Patrick LaForge – president, CEO, Edmonton Oilers
- Howard Lindzon – author and founder of StockTwits
- Christine Magee (1982) – president, co-founder of Sleep Country Canada
- Rob McEwen – chairman and CEO of McEwen Mining
- Ray Muzyka – CEO of BioWare
- Dave Nichol (1962) – former president, spokesperson, Loblaws
- Kevin O'Leary (M.B.A., 1980) – chairman, O'Leary Funds, CBC Television co-host, Lang and O'Leary Exchange, Dragon, ABC's Shark Tank, CBC's Dragons Den
- Grant Reuber (1950) – businessman, economist
- Edward Rogers III – president of Rogers Cable, son of Ted Rogers and grandson of Edward S. Rogers, Sr.
- Brian Ludlow (B.A. 2007) - CEO of Creative Art Partners
- Joseph Rotman (B.A. 1957 Philosophy) – businessman, philanthropist
- Ray Sharma (1996) – founder and CEO, XMG Studio
- Benjamin Smith – CEO of Air France–KLM, former president, Airlines at Air Canada
- John M. Thompson (B.ESc. 1966, LL.D. 1994) – chairman of the board, TD Bank Financial Group
- Prem Watsa – chairman and CEO, Fairfax Financial Holdings Limited
- Lee Seng Wee – former chairman, Oversea Chinese Banking Corporation, Singapore
- Galen Weston (1962) – head, Weston Foods
- Ray G. Young – EVP, CFO, General Motors Corporation

=== Government ===
- Eve Adams (B.A. 2001 Psychology) – Liberal Member of Parliament
- Alfred Apps (BA 1979) — president of the Liberal Party of Canada since 2009
- Ron Atkey – conservative politician
- James Bartleman (B.A. 1963 History) – Lieutenant Governor of Ontario
- Joyce Bateman (H.B.A. 1977) – Conservative Member of Parliament
- Adam Beck (1916) – former mayor of London
- Chris Bentley (1976) – Member of Ontario Provincial Parliament and Ontario Minister of Energy
- François Bourguignon (Ph.D. 1975 Economics) – Chief Economist of the World Bank
- Laurel Broten (LL.B.) – Liberal Member of Ontario Provincial Parliament
- John Carmichael (B.A. 1974 Geography) – Conservative Member of Parliament
- Margaret Chan (B.A. 1973 Brescia, M.D. 1977) – Director-General - Communicable Diseases, World Health Organization
- Chris Charlton (B.A. 1986 English) – Member of Parliament
- Sheila Copps (B.A. 1974 French and English from King's College) – former federal Minister of Heritage
- Pam Damoff (BA) – Federal Liberal Member of Parliament
- Frank de Jong – leader of Green Party of Ontario
- Jim Diodati (BA 1991) – Mayor of Niagara Falls, Ontario
- Janet Ecker (1975) – Ontario Minister of Finance
- Doug Ferguson – president of the Liberal Party of Canada 2008–2009
- Diane Finley (B.A. 1979, M.B.A. 1982) – Conservative Member of Parliament and Minister of Human Resources and Skills Development
- Joe Fontana – former Liberal Member of Parliament, mayor of London
- Cheryl Gallant (B.Sc. 1982 Chemistry) – Conservative Member of Parliament
- Roger Gallaway – politician
- Donald Getty (1955) – CFL player and Premier of Alberta
- Dianne Haskett (1977) – former mayor of London, Ontario
- Tom Hockin – Conservative politician
- Ed Holder (B.A. 1976 Philosophy) – Conservative Member of Parliament and Mayor of London, Ontario
- Tim Hudak (B.A. 1990 Economics) – Ontario MPP and Leader of the Progressive Conservative Party of Ontario
- Ron Irwin – diplomat and politician
- Gar Knutson (1983) – Liberal Member of Parliament
- Andrew Lawton – Conservative Member of Parliament
- Gloria Lindsay Luby – Conservative politician
- Janice MacKinnon – former Saskatchewan Minister of Finance
- Tiff Macklem – governor of Bank of Canada
- Paul Macklin – politician and lawyer
- Joy MacPhail – former BC finance minister and deputy premier
- Irene Mathyssen (B.A. 1974, B.Ed. 1975) – Ontario NDP MPP; NDP Member of Parliament
- Deb Matthews (B.A. Sociology, Ph.D. 2006) – Ontario MPP minister of health and long-term care
- Howard McCurdy – NDP Member of Parliament
- Paul McKeever (M.A. 1991, Ph.D studies 1991-1992, LL.B. 1995) – leader of the Freedom Party of Ontario
- Darcy McKeough – businessman, politician
- Cathy McLeod (B.Sc.N. 1981) – Conservative Member of Parliament
- Bill Morneau (B.A.) – Canadian Finance Minister
- Pat O'Brien (1971) – former Liberal Member of Parliament
- Gordon Osbaldeston (1953) – former U.S./Canadian Trade Commissioner
- Peter Partington – chairman of Niagara City Council
- Steve Peters (B.A. 1985 History) – Member of Ontario Provincial Parliament
- David Peterson – former premier of Ontario
- James Scott Peterson – Canadian minister of International Trade
- Tim Peterson – Liberal politician
- Rod Phillips (B.A.) – Ontario Minister of Finance
- Stephen Poloz (M.A.) – governor of Bank of Canada
- Brad Raffensperger – Georgia secretary of state during the 2020 United States presidential election
- John Robarts (1939) – former premier of Ontario
- Lloyd St. Amand – Liberal politician
- Peggy Sattler (BA 1983, MEd 2012) – NDP Member of Provincial Parliament
- Andrew Saxton (B.A. 1986 ACS) – Conservative Member of Parliament
- Kyle Seeback (LL.B. 1998) – Conservative Member of Parliament
- Dan Senor – spokesman for U.S. presidential envoy Paul Bremer
- Jagmeet Singh (B.Sc. 2001) – former leader of the New Democratic Party (2017–2025)
- Bruce Smith – Conservative politician
- Amandeep Sodhi (B.A. 2023) – Liberal member of Parliament
- Heather Stefanson – former premier of Manitoba
- Glenn Stevens – governor of the Reserve Bank of Australia
- Karen Stintz (B.A. 1992) – Toronto city councillor and chair of the Toronto Transit Commission
- Paul Szabo – politician
- Shirley Thomson – director of the McCord Museum
- Peter Towe – diplomat and businessman
- Bernard Trottier (M.B.A. 1992) – Conservative Member of Parliament
- Orville Alton Turnquest (1981) – MP in the Bahamas
- Frank Valeriote (B.A. 1976 King's) – Liberal Member of Parliament
- Elizabeth Weir (1976) – leader of the New Brunswick NDP
- John Wilkinson – Ontario MPP, Ontario Minister of Revenue
- John Reesor Williams – conservative politician
- David Winninger – NDP politician
- Elizabeth Witmer (1968) – Progressive Conservative MPP
- Stephen Woodworth (LL.B. 1977) – Conservative Member of Parliament
- Alvin Yeung – Hong Kong legislative councillor

=== Literature ===
- Emily Austin – writer
- Joan Barfoot – novelist
- Clare Bice – author
- Alice Munro (1976) – author; 2013 Nobel Laureate in Literature for "master of the contemporary short story"
- André Narbonne – writer
- Paul Vermeersch (1992) – poet

=== Sports ===
- Gary Agnew – coach, Columbus Blue Jackets
- Stacey Allaster (B.A. 1985, M.B.A. 2000) – Chair and CEO of Women's Tennis Association
- Paul Beeston (1967) – former president, Major League Baseball
- Shane Bergman – CFL football player, Calgary Stampeders
- Glenn Clark (1996) – head coach, Toronto Rock and former lacrosse player
- Chuck Dalton – Olympic basketball player
- Andy Fantuz – CFL football player, Hamilton Tiger-Cats
- Duane Forde – former CFL football player
- Robert Foxcroft – Olympic fencer
- Gino Fracas (B.A. 1955) – CFL football player
- Mark Frostad – horse trainer
- Sasha Gollish (Bachelor of Engineering) – competitive runner, Pan American Games bronze medalist, Maccabiah Games gold medalist
- Lirim Hajrullahu – CFL football player
- Katherine Henderson – president and CEO of Curling Canada and Hockey Canada
- Mike Inglis – Olympic gymnast
- Roger Jackson – Olympic rower
- Jeff Keeping – CFL football player
- John Kerr – Olympic sailor
- Silken Laumann (1988) – Olympic rower
- David Lee – CFL football player
- Rob MacDonald – appeared on The Ultimate Fighter 2; retired professional Mixed Martial Artist
- Vaughn Martin – NFL football player San Diego Chargers
- Marnie McBean (1997) – Olympic rower
- Zack Medeiros – CFL kicker
- Victor Mete – hockey player, Ottawa Senators
- Mike Neary – Olympic rower
- Lynn Nightingale – Olympic figure skater
- Barbara Olmsted – Olympic canoer
- Coulter Osborne – Olympic basketball player
- Bill Pataky – Olympic basketball player (transferred)
- Glenn Pettinger – Olympic basketball player
- Bob Phibbs – Olympic basketball player
- Skip Phoenix – Olympic diver and coach
- Al Pickard – Canadian Amateur Hockey Association president and Hockey Hall of Fame inductee
- Steve Rucchin (1994) – hockey player, over 700 NHL games played
- Eric Smith – Olympic canoer
- Jamie Taras – CFL football player
- Pierre Vercheval – Canadian Football Hall of Fame
- Tessa Virtue – Olympic ice dancer
- James Walker – Olympic rower
- Daryl Waud – CFL football player
- Tyrone Williams – NFL & CFL football player

=== Religion ===
- Thomas Christopher Collins (M.A. English) – Canadian Cardinal of the Catholic Church
- John T. Dunlap (Juris Doctor) – Prince and Grand Master and head of the Sovereign Military Order of Malta

=== Miscellaneous ===
- Princess Basmah Bani Ahmad of Jordan – wife of Prince Hamzah bin Al Hussein of Jordan
- Alberto Dahik (Economy and Mathematics) – Vice President of Ecuador (1992–1995), minister of finance (1986) and Conservative congressman (1988–1992)
- Sajjad Fazel – public health advocate
- Aman Hambleton – chess grandmaster, Twitch streamer
- Sharon Johnston (B.Sc.) – Viceregal Consort of Canada (David Johnston)
- Harley Pasternak – personal trainer

== Faculty ==
- Sir Frederick Grant Banting – 1923 Nobel Laureate in Medicine, co-discoverer of insulin
- Bob Barney – professor of kinesiology and Olympic scholar (LL.D., 2014)
- John Lane Bell – mathematician and philosopher
- Ian Brodie – former chief of staff of the Office of the Prime Minister
- Sheila Butler – visual artist, professor
- Alexander Dewdney – mathematician, computer scientist, and philosopher
- Don Gutteridge
- Douglas N. Jackson – designer of standardized tests
- Wilson Bryan Key – proponent of theory of "Subliminal Seduction"
- Charles Ling – professor of computer science
- John P. Metras – athletics director, football coach
- Michael Ondaatje – Poet, novelist
- Adrian Owen – Canada Excellence Research Chair in Cognitive Neuroscience and Imaging
- Balachandra Rajan – literary critic, theorist
- Carl Franz Robinow – bacteriologist
- J. Philippe Rushton – controversial psychology professor on race and intelligence
- Bernard Shapiro – Canadian Ethics Commissioner
- Robert Uffen – geophysicist, professor
- Hadley Williams – professor of surgery
- Mark S. Workentin – professor of organic chemistry

== Administration ==
=== Chancellors ===
- Bishop Isaac Hellmuth (1878–1885)
- Alfred Peache (1885–1900)
- M. R. Meridith (1909–1914)
- W. J. Roche (1916–1929) (also Western's first medical graduate)
- Henry Cockshutt (1929–1944)
- Howard Ferguson (1945–1946)
- Arthur R. Ford (1947–1955)
- Richard G. Ivey (1955–1961)
- Verschoyle Philip Cronyn (1961–1967)
- Albert W. Trueman (1967–1971)
- John Robarts (1971–1976)
- J. Allyn Taylor (1976–1980)
- Richard M. Ivey (1980–1984)
- D.B. Weldon (1984–1988)
- Grant L. Reuber (1988–1992)
- Reva Gerstein (1992–1996)
- Peter Godsoe (1996–2000)
- Eleanor Clitheroe (2000–2004)
- Arthur Labatt (2004–2008)
- John Thompson (2008–2012)
- Joseph Rotman (2012–2015) (died during term)
- Jack Cowin (2015–present)

=== Presidents and vice-chancellors ===
- Nathaniel James (1908–1914)
- Edward Braithwaite (1914–1919)
- "Triumvirate of Deans" (1919–1927)
  - Paul S. McKibbon (Dean of Medicine)
  - Hibbert W. Hill (Dean of Public Health)
  - W. Sherwood Fox (Dean of Arts)
- W. Sherwood Fox (1927–1947)
- George Hall (1947–1967)
- David Carlton Williams (1967–1977)
- George Connell (1977–1984)
- Alan K. Adlington (acting president, 1984–1985)
- George Pedersen (1985–1994)
- Paul Davenport (1994–2009)
- Amit Chakma (2009–2019)
- Alan Shepard (2019–present)

=== Others ===
- J. Howard Crocker – director of the physical education department (1930–1947), also served as president of the Amateur Athletic Union of Canada, previously a director with the YMCA

== In fiction ==
- Michael Patterson, from the comic strip For Better or For Worse
