= Julia Wright =

Julia Wright may refer to:

- Julia McNair Wright (1840–1903), American writer
- Julia M. Wright (born 1964), professor of English
- Julia Wright (born 1942), daughter of author Richard Wright

== See also ==
- Duey and Julia Wright House, a home designed by Frank Lloyd Wright in Wausau, Wisconsin
- Julie Wright, American softball coach
