= Stephen Willis =

Stephen Wills may refer to:

- Stephen Willis (footballer) (born 1986), Cook Islands footballer
- Stephen Willis (musicologist) (1946–1994), Canadian musicologist
