= Richard Ivey =

Richard Ivey may refer to:

- Richard G. Ivey, businessman and philanthropist, namesake of the Ivey Business School
- Richard M. Ivey (1925–2019), his son, Canadian lawyer and philanthropist
