= Irving Gerstein =

Canadian businessman and politician

The Honourable Irving Gerstein

Canadian Senator from Ontario
- In office January 2, 2009 – February 10, 2016

Personal details
- Born: Irving Russell Gerstein; February 10, 1941 (age 85) Toronto, Ontario, Canada
- Party: Conservative Party of Canada
- Education: Wharton School of the University of Pennsylvania
- Profession: Businessman

Irving Russell Gerstein, CM OOnt (born February 10, 1941) is a Canadian businessman, politician, and a former Conservative member of the Senate of Canada. He was appointed on the advice of Stephen Harper to the Senate on January 2, 2009, and retired on February 10, 2016, upon reaching the mandatory retirement age of 75.

== Biography ==
The son of Bertrand and Reva Gerstein, Gerstein was made a member of the Order of Canada in recognition for being a "respected businessman and a loyal and diligent volunteer and philanthropist" in 1999. In 2002, he was awarded the Order of Ontario.

Gerstein is best known for his time as president of Peoples Jewellers. He led the Peoples takeover of Zale Corporation in 1986 and then Zale's takeover of Gordon Jewelry in 1989. By 1990, he headed the world's largest jewelry retail empire.

He is or has served as a director of Atlantic Power Corporation, Medical Facilities Corporation, Student Transportation of America, Economic Investment Trust, CTV Inc., Traders Group Limited, Guaranty Trust Company of Canada, Confederation Life Insurance, and Scott's Hospitality.

Gerstein is an honorary director of Mount Sinai Hospital, Toronto, where he previously served as chairman of the board, chairman emeritus and director. He is also a director of the Canadian Institute for Advanced Research.

He is a long-time political fundraiser for the Progressive Conservative Party and now the Conservative Party of Canada.

Gerstein received his BSc. in economics from the Wharton School of the University of Pennsylvania.

On February 23, 2011, Irving Gerstein was charged, along with Senator Doug Finley, with violations of the Canada Elections Act. Elections Canada alleged that Irving Gerstein was complicit in a scheme that involved filing false tax claims and exceeding federal spending limits on campaign advertisements. If found guilty, Gerstein would have faced up to a year in prison and fines exceeding $25,000; however, the charges were dropped after the Conservative party agreed to pay a $52,000 fine.

Gerstein was the chair of the Senate's Standing Committee on Banking, Trade and Commerce which authored the 2013 report entitled Follow the Money: Is Canada Making Progress in Combatting the Money Laundering and Terrorist Financing? Not Really. The report cautioned that in spite of considerable resources expended, "there is a lack of clear and compelling evidence that Canada's regime is leading to the detection and deterrence of money laundering." The Senate also expressed concern that "Given that multinational financial institutions have recently been implicated in money laundering and terrorist financing, the Committee is concerned about non-compliance with the Act by reporting entities." The annual value of money laundering in Canada in 2011 was between $5 billion and $15 billion. Globally the annual value of global money laundering is between US$800 billion and US$2 trillion.

In June 2015 the same committee released a Senate report urging only light regulation of the digital currency Bitcoin.
