= Carl Franz Robinow =

German cytologist

- Born: 10 April 1909; Hamburg, Germany
- Died: 20 October 2006 (aged 97); London, Ontario, Canada
- Scientific career
- Fields: Microbiology
- Workplaces: University of Western Ontario

Carl Franz Robinow (10 April 1909 – 20 October 2006) was a German researcher in bacterial and fungal cytology. He studied medicine in Freiburg and Vienna, obtained his M.D. in Hamburg in 1934. Following formative research experience in Denmark, England, and the U.S. he moved to Canada in 1949 and worked in Department of Bacteriology and Immunology, Faculty of Medicine, University of Western Ontario.
