= Jodi Kovitz =

Canadian lawyer and nonprofit executive (born 1978)

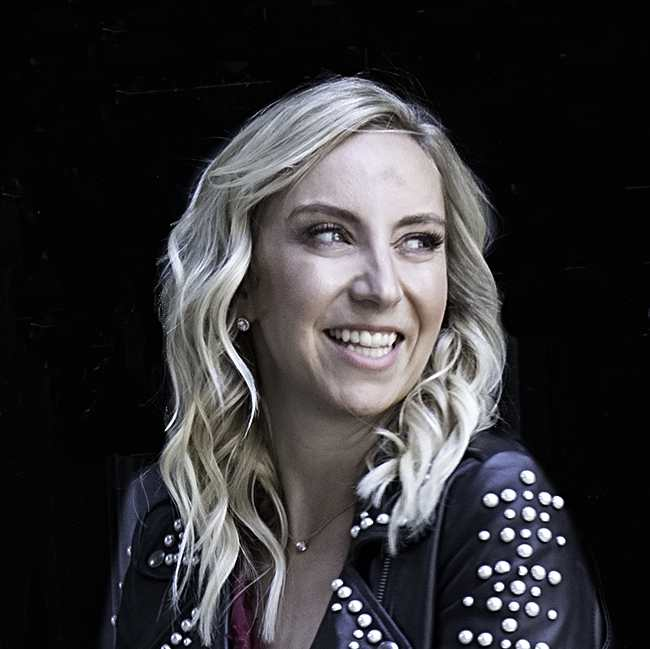
- Born: Calgary, Alberta, Canada
- Education: University of Western Ontario (Honours Business Administration, Bachelor of Arts, Richard Ivey School of Business) Osgood Hall Law School (Bachelor of Laws), Columbia Business School Chief Executive Officer Program
- Employer: Tangerine Bank
- Title: Managing Director
- Board member of: Toronto Global, Toronto SickKids Hospital Foundation, Lazaridis Institute Advisory Board
- Website: jodikovitz.com

Jodi Kovitz (born in 1978) is a Canadian lawyer and executive. She is the founder and CEO of #MoveTheDial, an organization to advance the participation and leadership of women in tech.

She is also on the board of directors at Sick Kids Hospital Foundation and a Managing Director at Tangerine Bank.

== Background ==
Kovitz was born in Calgary, Alberta, the daughter of lawyer Jeff Kovitz KC, and Karen Katchen. She has five siblings. Her father was a lawyer and is currently a retired businessman; her mother is a psychologist and executive coach.

Her mother moved to Toronto, Ontario, and married Bernie Katchen when Kovitz was six years old. She attended Forest Hill Collegiate Institute in Toronto.

In 1997 she enrolled at the University of Western Ontario at the Ivey Business School. She graduated in 2000 with a degree in Honours Business Administration, Bachelor of Arts. While at Western, she founded HandHeld Cards, a small business venture. She also created the CT Investment Challenge, an student focused, internet based game to raise funds for the Multiple Sclerosis Society of Canada; Kovitz studied international finance, at Commerciale L. Bocconi, Milan in Italy from January to June 2000.

In 2003 Kovitz enrolled in Osgoode Hall Law School. She graduated in 2005 with a Bachelor of Laws.

== Career ==
After graduating from business school, Kovitz worked at Workbrain as a marketing specialist from 2000 through 2001. In 2002 she joined Scotiabank, working in leadership resource management.

Kovitz was called to the Ontario Bar in 2006 and was an associate in the family law department of Torkin Manes from 2006 until 2011. In 2011 she joined Osler, Hoskin & Harcourt, directing client and business development, and leading growth initiatives. She continued in this role for five years; in 2014 she also volunteered as political advisor to lawyer Ari Goldkind during his campaign for mayor of Toronto.

In 2016 Kovitz became the chief executive officer of AceTech Ontario, a peer to peer community of technology executives. This organization was later renamed PeerScale. That year she joined John Tory's trade delegation to Israel.

In 2017 Kovitz, with five others, organized the first Elevate Toronto event, a three-day festival which promoted Canadian innovation. That year she founded #movethedial, a global social enterprise with a mission to advance the participation of women in tech. In her role as CEO, Kovitz participated in the writing of "Where's the Dial Now?", a study examining the current state of women in the tech and innovation community in Canada, a collaboration between #movethedial, PwC Canada and MARS.

After organizing local talks in its first year, in 2018 #movethedial held a full-day conference in Toronto, with about 1,000 attendees, presenting workshops and speakers from the tech community; a second conference in 2019 drew about 3,000 attendees. Arising from the restrictions relating to the pandemic, Kovitz discontinued #movethedial.

In 2018 Kovitz spoke at the Jewish Ethics Defined (JEDx) conference in Toronto. That year she helped organize the successful campaign for the re-election of John Tory, Mayor of Toronto.

In 2023 Kovitz was appointed as Chief Executive Officer of The Human Resources Professionals Association (HRPA) of Ontario and held that position until January 31, 2026.

In 2026 Kovitz was appointed as the Managing Director of Digital Small Business at the Tangerine Bank, a subsidiary of the Bank of Nova Scotia.

Kovitz also sits the advisory boards of the Whitecap Venture Capital Fund Advisory Board, Maple, Protexxa, and former director of Toronto Global.

Kovitz hosted the podcast series "Joyful Sundays".

== Community ==
Kovitz is part of the SickKids' Hospital Capital Campaign Cabinet which raises money for pediatric health in Ontario; as part of that initiative she is co-chair of the #tech4SickKids fundraising committee.

Kovitz was a former member of the Education and Human Resources Committee of the Board of Directors Sunnybrook Hospital as a community member.

Kovitz was appointed a board member of The Hospital for Sick Children Foundation in June 2025.

In August 2025 Kovitz joined the advisory board of the Morrissette Institute for Entrepreneurship at the Ivey School of Business at Western University

== Awards and recognition ==
Kovitz was recognized as one of Canada's 25 Women of Influence in 2018 Her name appeared on the list of WXN's Canada 100 most powerful women in 2017 and again in 2019. Kovitz was named the International Association of Business Communicators/Toronto, Communicator of the Year for 2020. Kovitz was named one of the top 100 Top HR Executives and Leaders in the World for 2025.

Kovitz received an honorary degree (LLD) from the University of Calgary on June 1, 2023.
