= Grant Reuber =

Canadian economist, civil servant, and businessman (1927–2018)

Grant Louis Reuber
- Born: 23 November 1927; Mildmay, Ontario
- Died: 7 July 2018 (aged 90); Toronto, Ontario
- Education: University of Western Ontario (BA 1950); Harvard University (MA 1952, PhD 1957)
- Spouse: Margaret Louise Julia Summerhayes (m. 1951)

Grant Louis Reuber, OC FRSC (23 November 1927 – 7 July 2018) was a Canadian economist, academic, civil servant, and businessman.

== Early life and education ==
Born in Mildmay, Ontario, the son of Jacob Daniel and Gertrude Catherine (Wahl) Reuber, Reuber attended Walkerton High School. He received an honours Bachelor of Arts degree in Economics from the University of Western Ontario in 1950. He received his master's degree in Economics from Harvard University in 1954 and his Ph.D. in 1957.

== Career ==
He was a professor of economics at the University of Western Ontario from 1962 to 1969, and was the first economist to explicitly use the inverse relationship between unemployment and inflation as a policy constraint. As a result, policy makers could no longer institute policies that lowered inflation without worrying about raising unemployment (and vice versa). He became the first dean of the Faculty of Social Science at the University of Western Ontario in 1969, was named vice-president (Academic) and Provost in 1974, and served as Chancellor from 1988 to 1992. At the time of his death the President of Western described his contributions to the university as "virtually unrivaled" and said that "no one has played so many important leadership roles within the institution".

From 1979 to 1980, he was the deputy minister of Finance under Joe Clark. From 1983 to 1987, he was president and Chief Operating Officer of the Bank of Montreal. From 1993 to 1999 he was chairman of the Canada Deposit Insurance Corporation, a period in which "virtually every aspect" of the organization was transformed.

From 1996 to 1999, he was chair of the Loran Scholars Foundation, and from 1998 to 2008 he chaired the Donner Prize jury.

In 1986, he was made an officer of the Order of Canada and a fellow of the Royal Society of Canada.

Academic offices
| Preceded by D. B. Weldon | Chancellor of the University of Western Ontario; 1988–1992 | Succeeded by Reva Gerstein |
