= Gavin Stuart =

Gynecology professor

Professor Gavin Stuart FRCPC FCAHS

Dean, Faculty of Medicine, University of British Columbia
- In office 2003–2015

Personal details
- Born: Gavin Charles E. Stuart Manitoba, Canada
- Education: Postgraduate in obstetrics and gynecology
- Alma mater: University of Western Ontario; Wayne State University School of Medicine
- Occupation: Professor

Gavin Charles E. Stuart is a Canadian medical academic who is Professor in the Department of Obstetrics and Gynecology, UBC Faculty of Medicine, where he formerly was Dean of Medicine (2003-2015) and Vice-Provost Health (2009-2016).

Stuart was born in Manitoba and attended medical school at the University of Western Ontario. He pursued postgraduate training in obstetrics and gynecology and then a fellowship in Gynecologic Oncology at Wayne State University School of Medicine. He has held faculty appointments at Wayne State University and the Tom Baker Cancer Centre, where later served as the centre's director and Head of the Department of Obstetrics and Gynecology. In 1999, he was appointed as Vice-President of the Alberta Cancer Board.

Stuart is a Fellow of the Royal College of Surgeons of Canada (elected 1980). He also is a Fellow of the Canadian Academy of Health Sciences and former Chair of the Board of the Association of Faculties of Medicine of Canada.

== Legal Issues ==
A lawsuit was filed against Stuart in 2008 for defamation of character by Dr. Cathy Popadiuk. The grounds of the lawsuit were a 2002 letter from Stuart that criticized Popadiuk's "research, teaching and the way she treated her patients". The legal proceedings and outcome of the court case have not been made publicly available. An independent review in 2008 concluded that Stuart's allegations to Popadiuk's superiors, which led to her "losing her status as an associate dean, losing access to support staff and effectively being shut out of decision-making on her own case", were the cause of subsequent workplace harassment and unfair treatment.
