= Arthur Labatt =

Canadian businessman (born 1934)

Arthur Sackville Labatt
- Born: May 11, 1934 (age 92); London, Ontario
- Occupation: Businessman
- Known for: Founder of Trimark Investment Management
- Spouse: Sonia Labatt
- Awards: Order of Canada

Arthur Sackville Labatt, OC (born May 11, 1934) is a Canadian businessman and the great-grandson of John K. Labatt, founder of the Labatt brewery. From 2004 to 2008, he was the chancellor of the University of Western Ontario (UWO) in London, Ontario, Canada.

== Life and career ==
Born in London, Ontario, to John Sackville Labatt and Elizabeth Anne Lynch, Labatt studied business at UWO for one year in 1953, and he also briefly studied at McGill University, where he joined the Kappa Alpha Society. However, he never graduated from either university.

He was expected to take over the Labatt brewery, but by the time he was an adult, the business had been sold outside of the family. Instead, he became an accountant with Clarkson Gordon and later worked in the financial sector. He founded Trimark Investment Management, a mutual fund company, in 1981.

Labatt became an Officer of the Order of Canada in 1996. He succeeded Eleanor Clitheroe as chancellor of UWO on October 28, 2004, and he served until 2008.

On February 7, 2007, the Labatt family donated $30 million to Toronto's Hospital for Sick Children—the largest donation in the hospital's history—in order to establish the Labatt Family Heart Centre (which will provide care for children with congenital heart disease), and to support the Brain Tumour Research Centre, which the Labatt family helped establish with a previous donation.

Academic offices
| Preceded by Eleanor Clitheroe | Chancellor of the University of Western Ontario; 2004–2008 | Succeeded by John M. Thompson |
