= L. Seale Holmes =

- Born: London, Ontario, Canada
- Died: November 26, 1961; London, Ontario, Canada
- Education: University of Western Ontario
- Occupations: dermatologist, radiologist, politician
- Known for: philately

Dr. Lawrence Sealewyn Holmes, M.D., known as L. Seale Holmes, (1884?–November 26, 1961) was a Canadian dermatologist and radiologist, politician and a noted philatelist.

Holmes was born in London, Ontario, Canada and attended local public and secondary schools. Holmes graduated from the University of Western Ontario in 1906, and completed postgraduate studies in Chicago and New York. He practised medicine in London, Ontario until he retired. He was a member of the Royal College of Physicians and Surgeons of Canada and served on the Board of Governors and on the Senate of the University of Western Ontario. He was one of the founding members of the London Academy of Medicine and was its first president.

Holmes served three terms as city councillor for London City Council. He represented three different wards.

Holmes was a noted philatelist. He founded the Victoria Stamp Company. Holmes was, together with the British North America Philatelic Society, who updated the catalogue after his death, author of the Holmes' specialized philatelic catalogue of Canada and British North America, a stamp catalogue of the postage stamps and postal history of Canada. The first edition of the catalogue was published in 1935; the 11th, and apparently last, was published in 1968 by Ryerson Press of Toronto, Ontario.

Holmes married and was the father of two sons, Dr. R. Brian Holmes and Keith Holmes. Holmes died on November 26, 1961, in London's St. Joseph Hospital at the age of 77.
