= Hart E. Posen =

Canadian academic

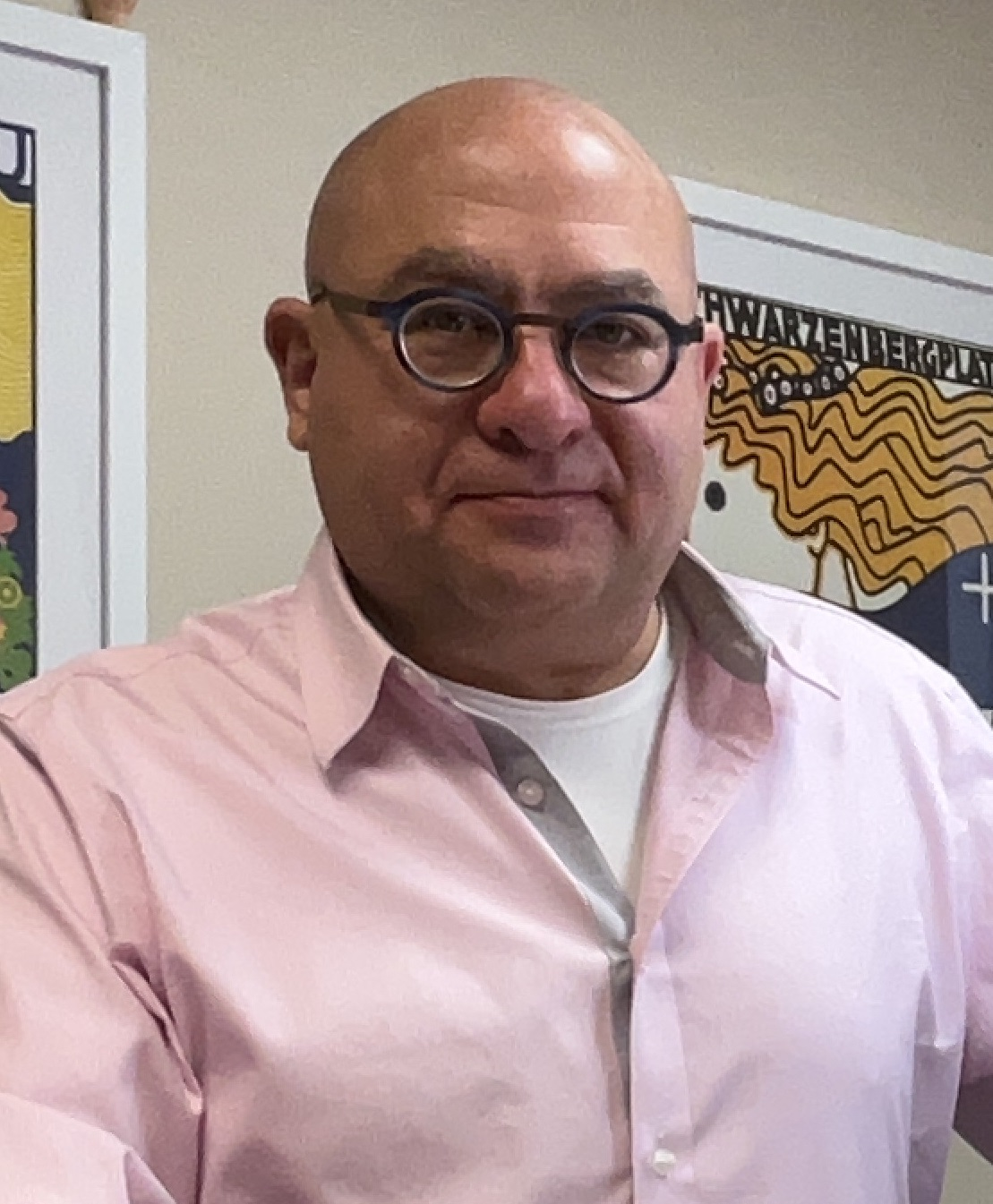
- Occupations: Academic, researcher, and business analyst

Academic background
- Education: B.Sc., Electrical Engineering; Master of Business Administration (MBA); M.Sc., Managerial Science and Applied Economics; Ph.D., Management
- Alma mater: University of Manitoba; University of Western Ontario, Ivey School of Business; University of Pennsylvania, Wharton School of Business

Hart E. Posen is an academic, researcher, and business analyst. He is a Professor of Strategy and Entrepreneurship at Dartmouth College, Tuck School of Business.

Posen's research focuses on understanding how companies and entrepreneurs develop and leverage knowledge, capabilities, and innovation to secure competitive advantage and how technological change can erode such advantage. He is ranked among the "Top 10% of Authors" by the Social Science Research Network (SSRN). He is an Associate Editor for the Strategic Management Journal, and was previously Associate Editor for Management Science from 2014 to 2018.

== Education ==
Posen received his Bachelor’s degree in Electrical Engineering at the University of Manitoba in 1988. He then enrolled at the University of Western Ontario, Ivey School of Business, and obtained his Master of Business Administration (MBA) in 2000. Following this, he moved to the United States, earning his M.Sc. degree in Managerial Science and Applied Economics in 2003, and a Ph.D. degree in Management in 2005, at the University of Pennsylvania, Wharton School of Business.

== Career ==
Prior to receiving his Ph.D., Posen spent over a decade as an entrepreneur in the technology and retail sectors. In 2005, he began his academic career as an Assistant Professor of Strategy at the University of Michigan, Ross School of Business. He served in this position until 2012, and subsequently joined the University of Wisconsin-Madison, School of Business as a Professor of Management and Human Resources, where from 2018 onward he held the Richard G. and Julie J. Diermeier Professorship in Business. Since 2023, he has been serving there as a Professor of Strategy and Entrepreneurship at Dartmouth College, Tuck School of Business.

== Research ==
Posen has written over 30 articles. He has examined how collective intelligence emerges and evolves in organizations via processes of individual and organizational learning. A common theme in Posen’s research is the argument that viewing a phenomenon from a learning-theoretic lens may provide insights that traditional decision-centric approaches overlook. His research findings hold implications for strategic management, innovation, entrepreneurship, and public policy-making.

Posen is best known for developing computational models of learning processes to understand issues of strategy, innovation, and entrepreneurship. He has developed and extended Multi-Armed Bandit models and NK Models to study processes of learning in organizations.

In his work on entrepreneurship, he stated that "to understand why so many new ventures fail, we need to understand this process of learning over time. It starts with an idea and moves through phases, a pre-entry learning phase and a post-entry learning phase." He demonstrated that while many of the challenges of entrepreneurship that lead to a high rate of failure, such as excess entry into the market and delayed exit from the market, which are commonly ascribed to behavioral biases may in fact be the result of the nature of entrepreneurial learning by unbiased entrepreneurs. He also considered how the design of decision-making by teams of entrepreneurs and the design of the learning and experimentation process of new venture formation may be used to alleviate the challenges posed by behavioral biases. In his 2005 study, he argued that even when entrepreneurial entry results in failure, the failed firms generate externalities that significantly and substantially reduce industry cost because surviving firms learn from their failed rivals.

Posen has worked on understanding how and why some firms fail and other survive in the face of technological change. In 2016, he focused his studies on understanding why firms appear to differ in their capacity to adapt to technological change. He developed a computational model of individual-level learning in an organizational setting characterized by interdependence and ambiguity. He demonstrated how exploration policy in the formative period of routine development can influence a firm's capacity to adapt to change in maturity. In 2012, Posen considered the popular wisdom that when technologies change, the firm must explore for new ways of doing things. He identifies conditions under which the firm’s best response to technological change is to continue to exploit the existing technology rather than explore in search of a new technology.

Much of his work focuses on imitation as a critical learning process in firms and industries. In his paper titled "On the Strategic Accumulation of Intangible Assets", Posen presented a hypothesis which highlights that intangible assets are inherently inimitable because would-be imitators need to replicate the entire learning path to achieve the same resource position. He tested the contributions of the intangible asset stock in the context of the firm’s final good-production function, and also determined the extent to which that asset stock deters rival mobility in the pharmaceutical industry. In an attempt to reconcile resource accumulation theory with the counterfactual evidence, he concluded that the accumulation process itself is not an isolating mechanism.

He has challenged the assumption that imitation always makes firms more similar. He identified learning mechanisms by which imitation may in fact be an important source of innovation. He examined "how an imitator's focus of attention during this post-imitation experiential learning process impacts performance heterogeneity." In another study, he conducted a comparative analysis between benchmarking and the "copy-the-best" imitation strategy of copying a subset of the best-performing firm's practices. Results of the study indicated that benchmarking is more effective in heterogeneous environments, on the other hand, the "copy-the-best" strategy is superior in the context of homogeneous environments because firms are more likely to copy novel practices from rivals.

Posen is frequently invited to lecture to audiences in North America, Europe, and Asia. His commentary on economic issues has appeared in various media outlets, including The Wall Street Journal, USA Today, New York Times, NPR National News, Marketplace, CNBC, and the BBC. Posen has also shared his perspectives and expertise regarding the challenges that the COVID-19 pandemic has posed to business. During the virtual series, The UW Now Livestream: Innovation in a Pandemic: How COVID-19 Will Change the Landscape of Business, he stated that "things like COVID-19, but other large disasters and even small things, create new problems to solve, they showcase old problems in a way that perhaps we hadn't thought of them before, and they also make possible new solutions to old problems."

== Awards and honors ==
- 2004 - Booz Allen Hamilton Award - Best Paper by a Doctoral Student, Strategic Management Society Meeting, Puerto Ricon
- 2010 - Best Paper Award – Atlanta Competitive Advantage Conference
- 2013-2014 - MBA Excellence in Teaching Award, Technion - Israel Institute of Technology
- 2016-2017 - Wisconsin Naming Partners Fellow
- 2018 - Richard G. and Julie J. Diermeier Professorship in Business
- 2021 - Distinguished Paper Award in Strategic Entrepreneurship, Academy of Management (STR Division) - 2021 Conference
- 2022 - Best Behavioral Strategy Paper Award, Strategic Management Society Conference

== Bibliography ==
- Knott, A. M., Bryce, D. J., & Posen, H. E. (2003). On the strategic accumulation of intangible assets. Organization Science, 14(2), 192-207.
- Knott, A. M., & Posen, H. E. (2005). Is failure good?. Strategic Management Journal, 26(7), 617-641.
- Levinthal, D., & Posen, H. E. (2007). Myopia of selection: Does organizational adaptation limit the efficacy of population selection?. Administrative science quarterly, 52(4), 586-620.
- Posen, H. E., & Levinthal, D. A. (2012). Chasing a moving target: Exploitation and exploration in dynamic environments. Management science, 58(3), 587-601.
- Posen, H. E., Keil, T., Kim, S., & Meissner, F. D. (2018). Renewing research on problemistic search—A review and research agenda. Academy of Management Annals, 12(1), 208-251.
