= Reva Gerstein =

Canadian psychologist (1917–2020)

- Born: Reva Appleby; 27 March 1917; Toronto, Ontario, Canada
- Died: 6 January 2020 (aged 102); Toronto, Ontario, Canada
- Occupations: Psychologist and educator
- Spouse(s): Bertrand Gerstein (m: 1939-1971, divorced); David Raitblat (m: 1979)
- Children: 2, including Irving Gerstein

Reva Appleby Gerstein CC OOnt (born Reva Appleby; 27 March 1917 – 6 January 2020) was a Canadian psychologist, educator, and mental health advocate. She was the first woman Chancellor of the University of Western Ontario, serving from 1992 to 1996.

== Biography ==
Gerstein was the daughter of Diana (Kraus) and David Appleby. After attending Fern Avenue Public School and Parkdale Collegiate Institute, Gerstein earned a Bachelor of Arts degree (1938), a Master of Arts degree (1939), and a PhD (1945) from the University of Toronto.

Reva Appleby married Bertrand Gerstein on 5 June 1939 at Toronto's Holy Blossom Temple. The couple had two sons, Irving Russell (1941-) and Ira Michael (1947-). In the fall of 1979, she remarried to David Raitblat. She turned 100 in 2017.

== Education ==
Hon.B.A. (1938) University of Toronto M.A (1939) University of Toronto Ph.D. (1945) University of Toronto Thesis: An analysis of infant behavioral development Supervised by Professor Blatz, Professor Bernhardt and Dr.Northway

== Career ==
From 1942-1945, while completing her PhD at the University of Toronto, Gerstein taught both undergrad and masters classes in psychology at U of T. During this time, she also conducted research on topics unrelated to her thesis, such as a study on the demographics and attitudes of first-year U of T students - First-Year Students: A Study of a Species, Canadian

Gerstein taught courses in psychology at the University of Toronto from 1942 to 1945, and later taught at York University. In 1945, she became National Director of Program Planning for the Canadian Mental Health Association, beginning what would become a decades-long career in mental health advocacy. Gerstein is credited with leading the shift in Canadian mental health care from a medical model to one focused on healthy, community-based living beyond psychiatric institutions.

In 1945 she completed her PhD, successfully defending her thesis about infant behavioural development. Gerstein was able to teach psychology at U of T at this time because there were openings in teaching positions due to men fighting in the war. In 1945 when World War II ended, Gerstein’s teaching position also ended because these positions were being filled by men returning from war. Although she stopped teaching classes, Gerstein continued doing research at U of T. At this time Gerstein was hired by the East York-Leaside Board of Health as a school psychologist, becoming the first psychologist working in the Ontario School system. While working for the Board of Health she continued her research efforts at U of T. In 1947 Dr. Gerstein published a study on Canadian prejudices towards minority groups (1947: Probing Canadian prejudice: a preliminary objective survey) and in 1949 she published a paper on suggestions for extending and updating the Bellevue-Weschler vocabulary response assessment (A suggested method for analyzing and extending the use of Bellevue – Weschler vocabulary response).

Although Gerstein conducted many research studies throughout her career, she is most well known for her policy and advocacy work rather than her research. While working for the East York-Leaside Board of Health Dr.Gerstein met Clarence Hinks, an eminent psychologist in the field of mental health. Hinks offered Gerstein a job as the National Director of Program Planning for the Canadian Mental Health Association. During her time working at the CMHA, Gerstein worked alongside Dr. Clarence Hincks and Dr. Jack Griffin, both of whom became great friends and mentors. While working for the CMHA, Gerstein established Mental Health Week, a week that took place annually which feature stories about mental health on CBC radio. As well as establishing Mental Health Week, which continues to this day, she created a weekly one-hour mental health program on CBC radio, bringing the topic of mental health out of the shadows at a time when such issues were taboo.

Gerstein was a woman with many jobs, never doing only one task at any given time. While working for the CMHA Gerstein was also the chair of a working group that reported to the Special policy sub-committee of the Welfare Council of Toronto from 1949-1952. This group focused on ways to implement integrated nursery school for children with emotional disturbances in private nurseries. Gerstein's working group recommended that the ideal integration ratio would be 6 disturbed children to 24 normal children and that the focus of the nursery care for disturbed children was treatment for normal children was preventative mental health care. At this time Gerstein also chaired the interdivisional committee on the mental health needs of children, which was charged with creating a blueprint for children's mental health services in Toronto. In their 1952 reports, both committees recommended "the development of day nurseries in poor housing areas, even if parents [are] not at work. Such children brought up in one congested room benefit mentally from the supervised freedom of an all-day nursery."

In 1950, Reva Gerstein founded the Canadian Council of Children and Youth to uphold and ensure the rights, interests and well-being of all children and youth in Canadian communities, government legislation, policy, programs and practices.

Gerstein's work for the CMHA and the Welfare Council of Toronto was the start of a long career in mental health advocacy and policy change.

In 1962, she was appointed by Premier John Robarts as the first woman member of the Committee on University Affairs (CUA) and served as its chairman from 1972 to 1975. In 1968, she spearheaded the creation of the Hinks Treatment Center for Adolescents, a center which she named after her mentor, to provide psychiatric care to children and adolescents in Toronto. This center still exists; it is now called the Hinks-Dellcrest Center and is a part of the SickKids Community Mental Health network. All the while, Gerstein was creating the center of adolescents she was teaching at U of T's School of Social Work and Nursing, where she emphasized preparing teachers to deal with student's mental health issues.

In the late 1970s, Dr.Gerstein was appointed by Premier Bill Davis to the newly reorganized Ontario Council on University Affairs (OCUA) and became a member and editorial chairman of the Commission on Post-Secondary Education in Ontario. In this capacity, she advocated for mature students, who at the time were not seen as legitimate university students.

In 1983 Gerstein was appointed as the Chair of Mayor Art Eggleton's Action Task Force on Discharged Psychiatric Patients in Toronto. The final report on the Mayor's action task force on discharged psychiatric patients later dubbed the "Gerstein Report" conceived of bringing together housing needs, support services and physical crisis centers backed up by networks of community workers and traditional hospital help. Based on this report she was able to establish Crisis centers in Toronto in 1989 which served as housing for mental health survivors as well as a place to receive support services such as mental health counselling or employment services. she served as the founding chairman of the board for these centers from 1989 – 1995. Upon her departure from the board, these centers were named Gerstein Centres in her honour.

In the 1980s, she chaired the Toronto Mayor's Action Task Force on Discharged Psychiatric Patients. As a result of the task force's recommendations, a number of community mental health services were established in Toronto, including the Gerstein Crisis Centre. Gerstein served as the founding chair of the board. Gerstein also helped establish the Hincks Treatment Centre for adolescents (now the SickKids Centre for Community Mental Health).

In 1991 Gerstein published a book titled Nurturing Health: A Framework on the Determinants of Health for the Healthy Public Committee of which she was the Chair. The book was the culmination of her work on mental health and education. Gerstein was also the first female Chancellor of The University of Western Ontario, serving as chancellor from 1992-1996.

In 1997 she was honoured with the Companion of the Order of Canada in recognition for her outstanding work on mental health reform.

Gerstein died in January 2020 at the age of 102.

== Boards ==
Throughout her career Gerstein sat on the boards of many companies and organizations;

- McGraw-Hill Ryerson Publishing Co.
- Maritime Life Assurance Co.
- Avon Inc.
- International Nickel Co. (INCO).
- Mount Sinai Hospital Governing Council Board Member
- Board Member of Baycrest Centre
- Vice Chairman of the Board of Trustees of the Hospital for Sick Children
- Chairman of the SickKids Foundation
- Chairman of the Hospital Council of Metro Toronto
- Member of the Ontario Police Commission
- Chairman of the Canadian Institute for Advanced Research (CIFAR).

== Honours ==
- In 1974, Gerstein was made a Member of the Order of Canada; she was promoted to the title of Officer in 1979, and to the title of Companion in 1997.
- In 1975 she was awarded an Honorary Doctor of Laws from the University of Guelph.
- In 1988, she was awarded the Order of Ontario.
- She received honorary degrees from University of Western Ontario (1972), Lakehead University (1974), University of Guelph (1975), Queen's University (1981), York University (1993), and the University of Toronto (1996)
- She was a Fellow of the Canadian Psychological Association.

Academic offices
Preceded by Grant Reuber	Chancellor of the University of Western Ontario; 1992–1996	Succeeded by Peter Godsoe
