= John Thompson (Canadian banker) =

John M. Thompson
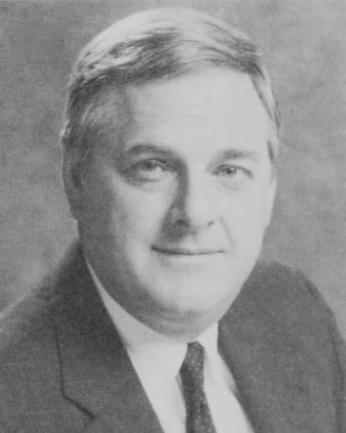
- Born: 27 October 1942 (age 84); Montreal, Quebec
- Education: Upper Canada College ('60); University of Western Ontario (BESc 1966)
- Spouse: Melinda Northway (m. 1967)

John Munro Thompson (born 27 October 1942) was the non-executive chairman of the board of Toronto-Dominion Bank Financial Corporation (TDBFC). He has held the position of Director at TDBFC since 1988 and was chairman of the board from 2003 to 2010.

== Biography ==
John Munro Thompson was born on 27 October 1942 in Montreal to John Munro Thompson (1915–1998) and Joyce Horsey (1917–2016). John Sr. was the chairman of Crush International Limited.

Thompson holds an undergraduate degree in engineering science from the University of Western Ontario where he joined the Kappa Alpha Society, and has completed the Executive Management programs at the Richard Ivey School, at the University of Western Ontario and the Kellogg Graduate School of Business at Northwestern University. In March 2008, he was named as the 20th Chancellor of The University of Western Ontario. He was officially installed as Chancellor at the Fall Convocation in 2008 and served a four-year term through 2012.

Thompson began his IBM career in Canada as a systems engineer in 1966. There, he held a variety of management jobs, before being elected president and chief executive officer of IBM Canada, Ltd. in 1986. In January 1991, Thompson moved to the United States to become Corporate Vice President of Marketing, charged with developing IBM's strategy for entering the services business, now a $60 billion operation for IBM. In October 1993, he became Senior Vice President of IBM's Server Group, responsible for mainframe and midrange computers. From January 1995 until August 2002, he was the Senior Vice President responsible for forming IBM's Software Group, after which time he was elected Vice Chairman of the IBM Board.

He is also the retired Vice Chairman of the Board of IBM Corporation, a position he held from 2000 to 2002. Thompson is also a board member at Royal Philips Electronics N.V. (NYSE:PHG) and The Thomson Corporation (NYSE:TOC). He is also Vice Chairman of the board of trustees for the Hospital for Sick Children and a director of the Atlantic Salmon Federation. He is a past director of the Hertz Corporation, the Robert Mondavi Corporation, the European Finance Foundation, the Conference Board of Canada and the Canadian Business Council for National Issues. He served on three Ontario Government Councils for education reform, human resources reform and industrial policy.

Thompson lives in Toronto and is married with three grown children.

Academic offices
Preceded by Arthur Labatt	Chancellor of the University of Western Ontario; 2008–2012	Succeeded by Joseph Rotman
