= Eleanor Clitheroe =

Canadian cleric and former businesswoman

The Reverend Eleanor Clitheroe
- Born: January 29, 1954 (age 72); Montreal, Quebec, Canada
- Education: University of Western Ontario (LLB, MBA); McGill University (LLM); Wycliffe College, Toronto (MDiv)
- Occupation: Cleric
- Spouse(s): Al Bakaitis (1975-78), Peter Jewett, Randy Bell

Eleanor Ruth Clitheroe (born January 29, 1954) is a Canadian cleric and former businesswoman. She was president and CEO of Hydro One, a successor company to Ontario Hydro owned by the Province of Ontario.

== Life and career ==
Born in Montreal, Quebec in 1954, Clitheroe earned her LLB from the University of Western Ontario (UWO) in 1977. In 1978 she earned her LLM from McGill University, and earned her MBA from UWO in 1980's. In 2005, she obtained a MDiv, from Wycliffe College at the University of Toronto. Clitheroe is a candidate for a Ph.D. in Theology at the University of Toronto.

She articled at the Tory, Tory DesLauriers & Binnington law firm in Toronto, and worked for the Canadian Imperial Bank of Commerce. She was Ontario's deputy minister of finance under the New Democratic Party of Bob Rae from 1990 to 1993. She was then appointed a vice-president of Ontario Hydro. When it was reorganized into five companies, she was appointed president and CEO of Hydro One, from which she received over $2 million annual income and benefits in 2001. In 2002, she was named Business Woman of the Year by the National Post. Her tenure as CEO ended in the same year after scandal over money and management.

From 2000 until 2004, she was chancellor of the University of Western Ontario. In 2005, she was ordained a deacon in the Anglican Church of Canada, and later that year, ordained a priest. She has been the executive director of Prison Fellowship Canada, leaving the position in 2013, and Padre to the Governor General's Horse Guards. She has been pastor at St. Luke's Anglican Church in Smithville, Ontario since 2008 and was awarded The Queen Elizabeth Diamond Jubilee Medal.

Clitheroe filed a lawsuit against the utility for severance compensation and increased pension after specific legislation limiting benefits at Hydro One was passed by the Progressive Conservative government. This lawsuit and appeals were dismissed.

Academic offices
Preceded by Peter Godsoe	Chancellor of the University of Western Ontario; 2000–2004	Succeeded by Arthur Labatt
