= Mark S. Workentin =

- Born: Canada
- Education: McMaster University, University of Western Ontario
- Scientific career
- Fields: Materials chemistry, organic electrochemistry, organic photochemistry, physical organic chemistry
- Workplaces: University of Western Ontario

Mark S. Workentin is a professor of organic chemistry at the University of Western Ontario. The primary interests of the Workentin research group are materials chemistry, organic electrochemistry, organic photochemistry, physical organic chemistry and physical materials organic electrophotochemistry.

== Education ==
- Ph.D. in 1992 from McMaster University
- B.Sc. in 1988 from the University of Western Ontario

== Academic and research experience ==
- University Faculty Scholar, The University of Western Ontario: 2005–2007
- Professor of Chemistry, The University of Western Ontario: 2005–present
- Associate Professor, The University of Western Ontario: 2000–2005
- Assistant Professor, The University of Western Ontario: 1995–2000
- Associate Research Officer, National Research Council: 1994–1995
  - Steacie Institute For Molecular Sciences
  - Organic Reactions Dynamic Group
- Research Associate, National Research Council: 1992–1994

== Awards and honours ==
- University Faculty Scholar
- Premier's Research Excellence Award
- Marilyn Robinson Award for Excellence in Teaching
- Alumni Western, Bank of Nova Scotia, University Students' Council Award for Excellence in Undergraduate Teaching (1997–98, 2001–02)
- Canadian National Congress-International Union Pure and Applied Chemistry (CNC-IUPAC) Award
- Ontario Confederation of University Faculty Associations Award for Excellence in University Teaching
- USC Teaching Honour Roll (2001–2005)
- NRC Research Associateship (1992–1994)
- NSERC Postdoctoral Scholarship (1992) – declined to take position at NRC
- NSERC Doctoral Prize finalist (1993)
- NSERC Postgraduate Scholarships (1988–1992)
- McMaster University Centennial Scholarships for Academic Excellence (1988–1992)
