= Julia M. Wright =

Canadian professor of English

- Born: 1964 (age 61–62)

Academic background
- Education: PhD., English Literature, University of Western Ontario
- Thesis: The politics of defamiliarization in Blake's printed works (1994)

Academic work
- Discipline: English
- Institutions: University of Waterloo; Dalhousie University

Julia Margaret Wright (born 1964) FRSC is a professor in the Department of English and University Research Professor at Dalhousie University. Wright is an elected Fellow of the Royal Society of Canada.

== Education ==
Wright completed her Ph.D. in English Literature at the University of Western Ontario in 1994.

== Career ==
While at the University of Waterloo in 1997, Wright was awarded the John Charles Polanyi Prize for Literature by the Ontario government for her research around imperialism in India and Ireland in the early 19th century. In 2002, Wright joined Wilfrid Laurier University as a tier-2 Canada Research Chair in English and Cultural Studies. At Wilfrid Laurier, Wright published a book titled "Blake, Nationalism and the Politics of Alienation" which won the Northeast Modern Language Association/Ohio University Press Book Award. She stayed at Wilfrid Laurier until 2005 when she accepted a position as a tier-2 Canada Research Chair in European Studies at Dalhousie University.

In 2013, Wright was named an Associate Dean of Research for the Faculty of Arts and Social Sciences at Dalhousie. In her role as Associate Dean of Research, Wright helped coordinate events at Dalhousie with the Social Sciences and Humanities Research Council.

In 2015, Wright was nominated for Director, Associations of the Canadian Federation for the Humanities and Social Sciences. On February 17, 2015, Wright and Dominique Marshall were elected to the position.

In 2017, Wright was re-elected as Director, Associations of the Canadian Federation for the Humanities and Social Sciences. She was also elected a Fellow of the Royal Society of Canada. In 2018, she was also named the President-Elect for the Dalhousie Faculty Association.

== Publications ==
The following is a list of publications:

- Blake, Nationalism and the Politics of Alienation (2004)
- Ireland, India, and Nationalism in Nineteenth-Century Literature (2007)
- Irish literature, 1750-1900: an anthology (2008)
- Representing the National Landscape in Irish Romanticism (2014)
- Men with stakes: masculinity and the gothic in US television (2016)
