= Richard M. Ivey =

Canadian lawyer and philanthropist (1925–2019)

- Born: Richard Macaulay Ivey; October 26, 1925; London, Ontario, Canada
- Died: December 28, 2019 (aged 94)
- Occupations: Lawyer and businessman
- Known for: Richard Ivey Foundation
- Spouse: Beryl Nurse
- Children: 4

Richard Macaulay Ivey, CC QC (October 26, 1925 – December 28, 2019) was a Canadian lawyer, businessman and philanthropist.

== Life and career ==
Ivey was born in London, Ontario, and he attended Ridley College in St. Catharines, Ontario. He then earned an Honours Business Administration (HBA) degree from the University of Western Ontario (UWO) in 1947.

While attending UWO, Ivey was a member of the Delta Upsilon fraternity and graduated in the same class as his successor as Chancellor, David B. Weldon. Ivey served as Chancellor of UWO from 1980 to 1984, while his father (Richard G. Ivey) had served as Chancellor from 1955 to 1961.

In 1947, Ivey and his father established the Richard Ivey Foundation, a private charitable foundation located in Toronto. It had assets of over CAD $62 million in 2002 and has given away over CAD $56 million.

In 1988, Ivey was made a Member of the Order of Canada. He was subsequently promoted twice – to Officer in 1994 and Companion in 2000.

Academic offices
Preceded by John Allyn Taylor	Chancellor of the University of Western Ontario; 1980–1984	Succeeded by David Black Weldon
