= Stephen Willis (musicologist) =

Canadian musicologist and archivist

- Born: 7 December 1946; Collingwood, Ontario, Canada
- Died: 11 September 1994 (aged 47); Ottawa, Ontario, Canada
- Education: University of Western Ontario; Columbia University
- Occupations: musicologist and archivist

Stephen Charles Willis (7 December 1946 – 11 September 1994) was a Canadian musicologist and archivist. A graduate of the University of Western Ontario and Columbia University, he taught on the faculty of the University of Ottawa from 1979 to 1985. He also served as head of the manuscript collection of the Music Division at the National Library of Canada (NLC) from 1977 to 1994. At the NLC he organized several notable exhibitions, including ones dedicated to composer Alexis Contant (1979), famous Canadian organists (1983), and bells through the ages (1986).

Born in Collingwood, Ontario, Willis was considered an authority on composer Luigi Cherubini, and notably penned the composer's entry in The New Grove Dictionary of Opera. He also contributed several music-related articles to The Canadian Encyclopedia, National Library News and the Experimental Music Catalogue. He was also a frequent guest lecturer at universities and conferences on the topics of Cherubini, 19th century French opera, and the organization of music archives.

Willis died in 1994 in Ottawa, Ontario.
