= Flau'jae Johnson =

American basketball player and rapper (born 2003)

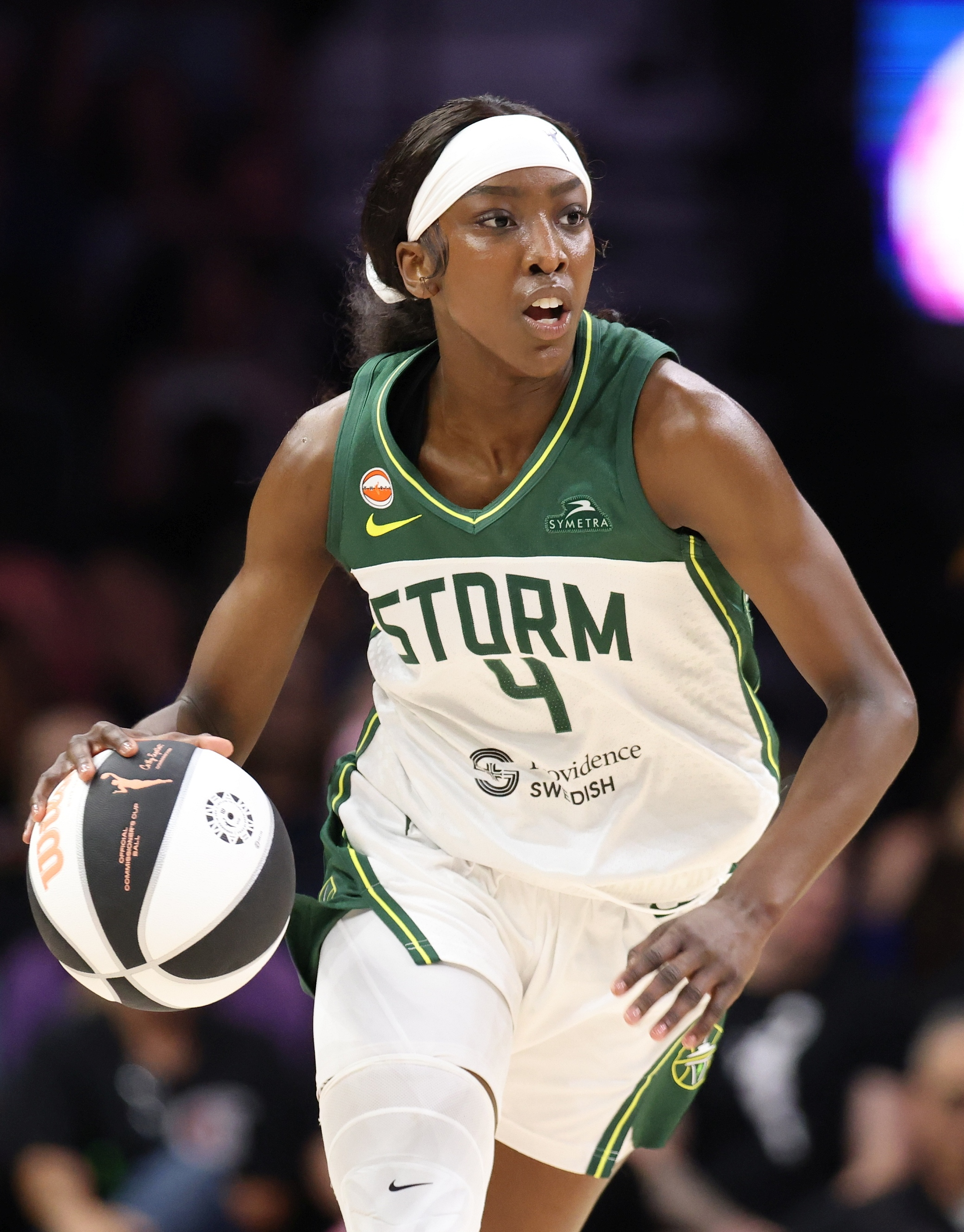
- Johnson with the Seattle Storm in 2026

No. 4 – Seattle Storm
- Position: Shooting guard
- League: WNBA

Personal information
- Born: November 3, 2003 (age 23) Savannah, Georgia, U.S.
- Listed height: 5 ft 10 in (1.78 m)

Career information
- High school: Sprayberry (Marietta, Georgia)
- College: LSU (2022–2026)
- WNBA draft: 2026: 1st round, 8th overall pick
- Drafted by: Golden State Valkyries
- Playing career: 2026–present

Career history
- 2026–present: Seattle Storm

Career highlights
- WNBA All-Rookie Team (2026); NCAA champion (2023); 2× Third-team All-American – AP, USBWA (2025, 2026); 2× First-team All-SEC (2025, 2026); Second-team All-SEC (2024); SEC Freshman of the Year (2023); SEC All-Freshman Team (2023); McDonald's All-American (2022)
- Stats at Basketball Reference
Medals
Representing the United States
Women's basketball
FIBA AmeriCup
Gold medal – first place	2025 Chile
Women's 3x3 basketball
FIBA 3x3 AmeriCup
Silver medal – second place	2026 San Salvador

Flau'jae Monae Johnson (flaw-JAY; born November 3, 2003) is an American rapper and professional basketball player for the Seattle Storm of the Women's National Basketball Association (WNBA) and for Vinyl of Unrivaled. She played college basketball for the LSU Tigers.

== Early life ==
Johnson was born on November 3, 2003, in Savannah, Georgia. Her father, Jason Johnson, was a rap musician who performed under the name Camoflauge. He was shot and killed in May 2003, about six months before her birth, in a case that remains unsolved. Lakia Brooks, Flau'Jae's mother, said that her given name is a tribute to her late father. “[Before he died] we argued 3 to 4 days about that name. But after he passed away, like a month later, I was like, ‘This is the last big decision that he's going to have to make for her.’”

Johnson grew up playing baseball as a pitcher and was the only girl on her team. She played basketball for Sprayberry High School in Marietta, Georgia. As a senior, Johnson was named Region 6-6A Player of the Year, and she left as her school's all-time leading scorer. She earned most valuable player honors at the Jordan Brand Classic after scoring 27 points, and played in the McDonald's All-American Game. Johnson was also the only girl to play in the Iverson Classic. Her number was retired by Sprayberry, and she became the first girl to receive the honor.

== College career ==
=== Freshman season ===
Johnson entered her freshman season as LSU's starting shooting guard. On November 20, 2022, she recorded a season-high 27 points, 10 rebounds, six steals and five assists in a 100–45 win over Northwestern State. As a freshman, Johnson averaged 11 points and 5.9 rebounds per game, helping her team win its first national championship. She was named the 2022–23 Southeastern Conference (SEC) Freshman of the Year.

=== Sophomore season ===
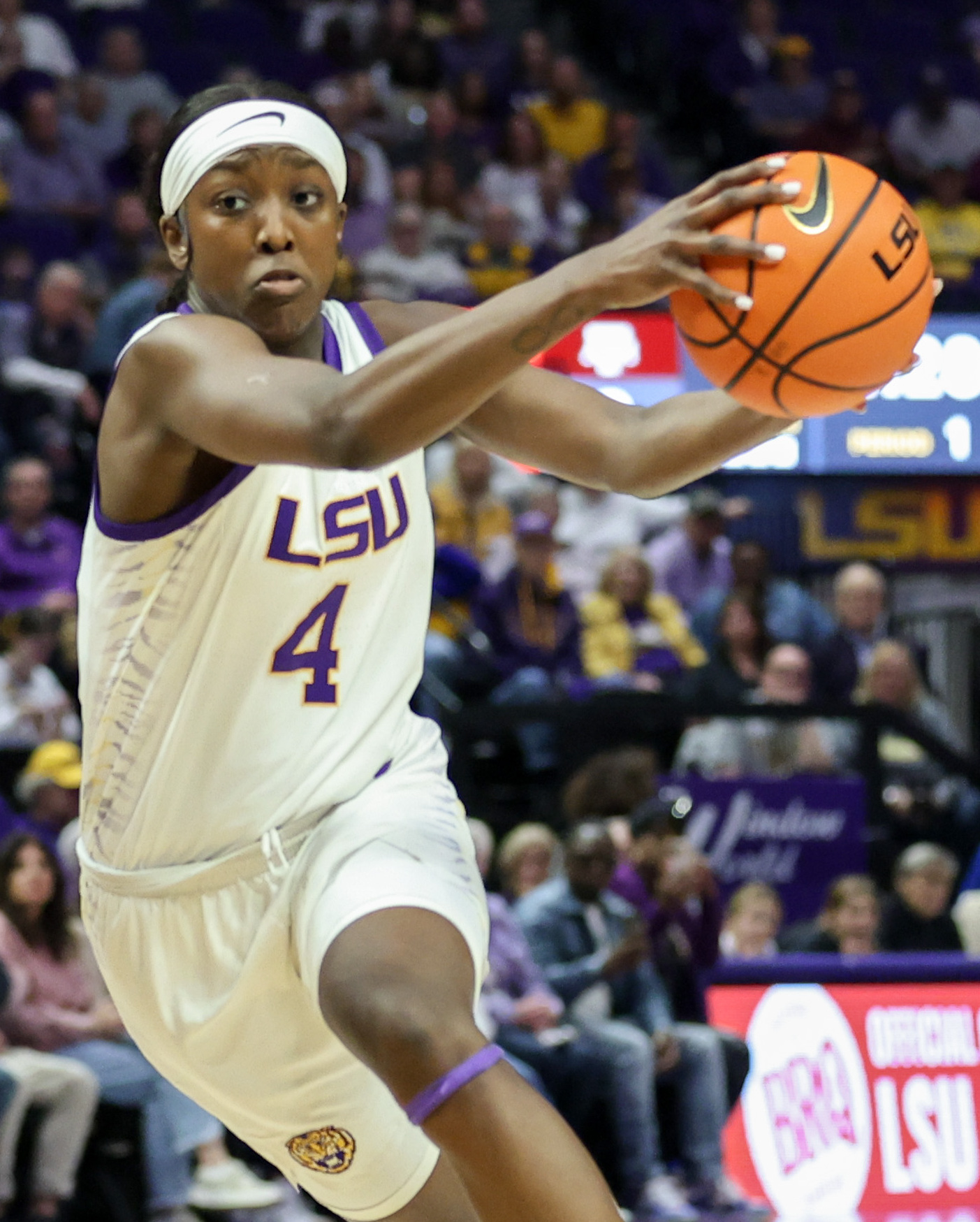
Johnson in 2024

In her sophomore season, Johnson played in 36 games and started 34 of them. Due to illness, she missed one game and played off the bench in another two in November. Johnson improved her averages in every statistical category except for rebounds, and was a key player for the Tigers throughout the season. LSU finished the SEC regular season with a 13–3 record, and Johnson was named in Second Team All-SEC. In the SEC Tournament, Johnson led the team in scoring in both the quarterfinals and semifinals, scoring 25 points against Auburn and then 21 points against Ole Miss. In the finals against South Carolina, Johnson was involved in a tussle that resulted in the ejection of six players (Johnson was not among those ejected) and the arrest of her brother. After the game, Johnson apologized to Gamecocks' coach Dawn Staley for her role in the fight. LSU entered the NCAA Tournament as the third seed. Johnson was the top scorer for LSU in their second-round win, 83–56, over Middle Tennessee. In the Sweet Sixteen win, 78–69, over the second-seeded UCLA, Johnson recorded 24 points, 12 rebounds, and 2 blocks and was once again the top scorer for the Tigers and an overall key contributor. In an Elite Eight rematch of the 2023 championship game against the first-seeded Iowa, Johnson was again the top scorer for the team with 23 points, but LSU lost 87–94.

=== Junior season ===
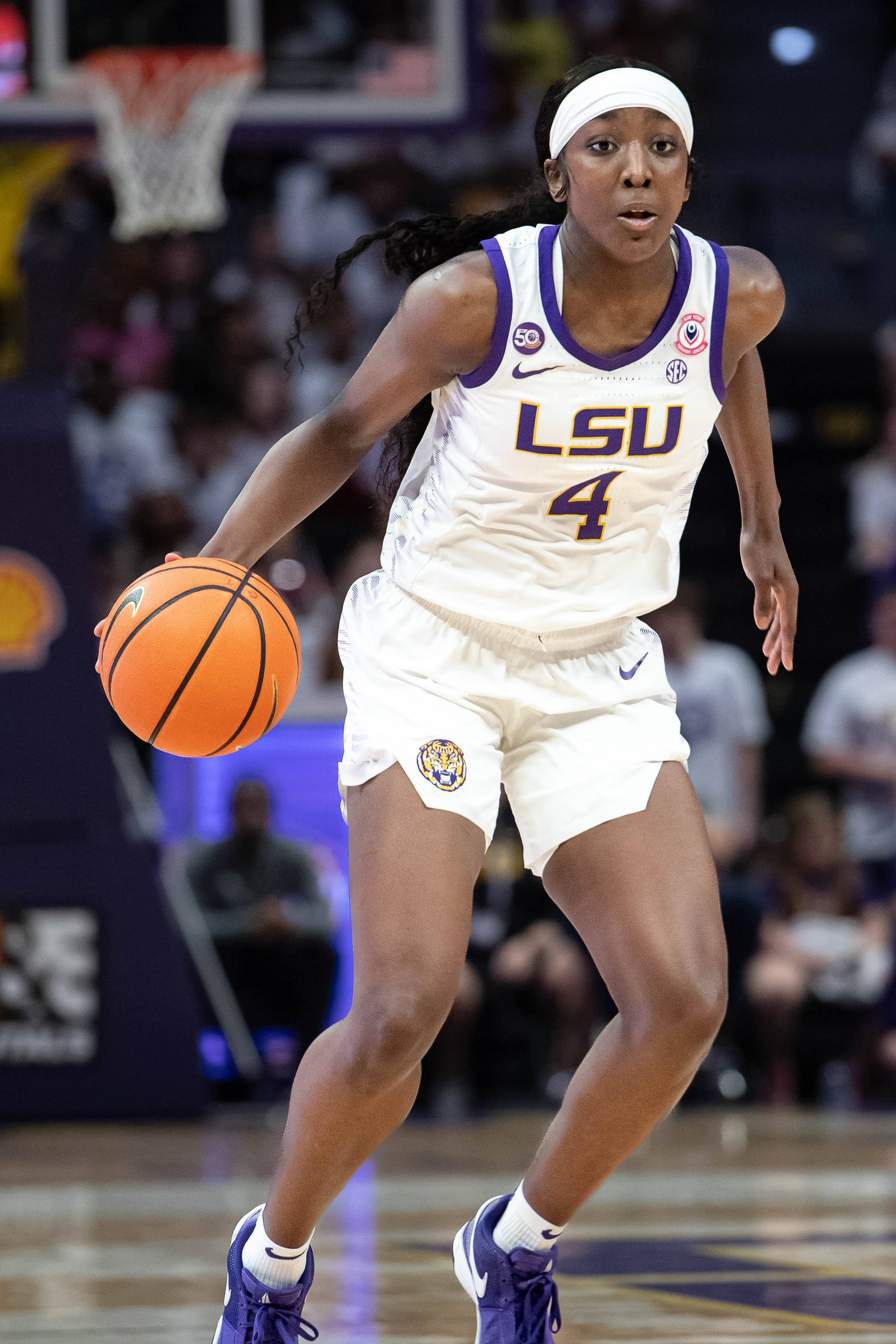
Johnson with the LSU Tigers in 2025

Johnson started all 34 games in her junior season but missed the 2025 SEC women's basketball tournament due to shin inflammation. She returned for the NCAA Tournament and was the top scorer with 22 points in the first-round rout of San Diego State, 103–48. She scored a career-high 28 points, 24 of which came in the second half, in LSU's Elite Eight loss to UCLA, 65–72.

== Professional career ==
=== WNBA ===
==== Seattle Storm (2026–present) ====
On April 13, 2026, Johnson was selected with the eight overall pick in the 2026 WNBA draft by the Golden State Valkyries. That same night, Johnson was traded from the Valkyries to the Seattle Storm, in exchange for Marta Suárez (16th pick overall) along with a 2028 second-round pick.

== National team career ==
On June 19, 2025, Johnson was named to team USA's roster for the 2025 FIBA Women's AmeriCup. During the tournament she averaged 4.3 points, 3.3 rebounds and 1.0 assists per game and won a gold medal.

== Career statistics ==
=== WNBA ===
Legend
GP	Games played	GS	Games started	MPG	Minutes per game	RPG	Rebounds per game
APG	Assists per game	SPG	Steals per game	BPG	Blocks per game	PPG	Points per game
TO	Turnovers per game	FG%	Field-goal percentage	3P%	3-point field-goal percentage	FT%	Free-throw percentage
**Bold**	Career best	°	League leader

==== Regular season ====
Stats current through end of 2026 season

WNBA regular season statistics
Year	Team	GP	GS	MPG	FG%	3P%	FT%	RPG	APG	SPG	BPG	TO	PPG
2026	Seattle	42	42	28.7	.402	.296	.800	4.8	2.9	1.4	0.7	2.6	14.9
**Career**	1 year, 1 team	42	42	28.7	.402	.296	.800	4.8	2.9	1.4	0.7	2.6	14.9

=== College ===
Year	Team	GP	GS	MPG	FG%	3P%	FT%	RPG	APG	SPG	BPG	TO	PPG
2022–23	LSU	**36**	**36**	27.6	42.4	33.0	69.6	**5.9**	1.9	1.2	0.8	2.3	11.0
2023–24	LSU	**36**	34	**32.4**	**50.4**	38.0	76.9	5.5	**2.5**	**2.1**	**1.0**	2.0	14.9
2024–25	LSU	34	34	31.6	46.8	38.3	**81.0**	5.6	**2.5**	1.7	0.9	2.7	**18.6**
2025–26	LSU	35	35	25.2	46.5	**39.3**	69.3	4.2	**2.5**	1.3	0.7	**1.7**	14.2
**Career**		141	139	29.2	46.7	37.3	74.8	5.3	2.3	1.6	0.9	2.2	14.6
Statistics retrieved from Sports-Reference.

== Music ==
Johnson is also a rapper signed to Roc Nation. She was inspired to pursue a rap career to continue her father's legacy. Johnson has appeared on The Rap Game and America's Got Talent.

=== Albums ===
Title	Album details
4 My Fans	Released: July 14, 2023; Label: Flauge Entertainment; Format: Digital download, streaming
Best of Both Worlds	Released: June 28, 2024; Label: Flauge Entertainment; Format: Digital download, streaming
Flau & B	Released: February 14, 2025; Label: Flauge Entertainment; Format: Digital download, streaming

=== Extended plays ===
Title	Album details
It's a Situation 4 Pack Mix Series Vol. 1	Released: May 18, 2022; Label: Flauge Entertainment; Format: Digital download, streaming
Phenom 4 Pack Mix Series Vol. 2	Released: August 12, 2022; Label: Flauge Entertainment; Format: Digital download, streaming
4 Wave	Released: February 9, 2024; Label: Flauge Entertainment; Format: Digital download, streaming
4 the Lovers	Released: February 9, 2024; Label: Flauge Entertainment; Format: Digital download, streaming

== Personal life ==
=== Business interests ===
Johnson is estimated to be one of the highest-earning college basketball players from name, image, and likeness (NIL) deals. She signed NIL deals with brands such as Puma, Meta, JBL, and Taco Bell. In December 2024, Johnson became the second college athlete to sign an NIL deal and receive an equity stake in women’s 3-on-3 basketball league Unrivaled. She was also part of "The Future is Unrivaled Class of 2025".

=== In popular culture ===
Johnson was featured on The Money Game: LSU, a six-part NIL-focused docuseries by Prime Video that followed her, Jayden Daniels, Angel Reese, Livvy Dunne, Alia Armstrong, and Trace Young through LSU's 2023–24 sports season. The series was nominated for Outstanding Documentary Series (Serialized) at the 46th Sports Emmy Awards.

In March 2025, ESPN+ announced a second season of their docuseries, Full Court Press would premiere in May 2025. The series (from Peyton Manning's Omaha Productions and Words & Pictures) followed Johnson, Notre Dame's Hannah Hidalgo, and USC's Kiki Iriafen throughout their 2024–25 NCAA basketball season and postseason.
