= Trace Young =

American college basketball player (born 2001)

Personal information
- Born: July 9, 2001 (age 25) Austin, Texas, U.S.
- Listed height: 6 ft 4 in (1.93 m)
- Listed weight: 185 lb (84 kg)

Career information
- High school: Dripping Springs (Dripping Springs, Texas)
- College: Colorado State (2020–2023); LSU (2023–2025)
- Position: Guard
- Number: 0, 14

Trace Young (born July 9, 2001) is an American former college basketball player. He played for the Colorado State Rams and the LSU Tigers.

== Early life ==
Trace Young was born on July 9, 2001, in Austin, Texas. Young attended Dripping Springs High School and later moved to join Colorado State University to study business marketing. He was active in his church. Young attended Austin Ridge Bible Church and later worked in music ministry at Mill City Church.

Young developed an interest in basketball at an early age and later became involved in music and content creation. During his junior year, he averaged 9.3 points, 4.4 rebounds, 1.5 assists, and 0.7 steals per game, earning District 25-5A Newcomer of the Year honours. In his senior season, he contributed to the team's 23–6 overall record and a berth in the Texas 5A regiona legional tournament.

== College career ==
=== Colorado State (2020–2023) ===
Young began his college basketball career at Colorado State University, joining the team as a walk-on for the 2020–21 season. As a freshman, he appeared in seven games in a reserve role. During his sophomore year, he saw limited playing time, appearing in four games and participating primarily as part of the scout team.

In the 2022–23 season, his junior year, Young played in 11 games. He recorded his first career points in a game against Colorado on December 8, 2022, and logged a season-high 12 minutes against Air Force.

=== LSU (2023–2025) ===
Young transferred to LSU for the 2023–24 season, seeking opportunities to develop his game. During his senior season, he appeared in two games, logging minimal minutes against Arkansas and Mississippi State. In his fifth-year senior season (2024–25), Young played in nine games, recording one rebound and one assist over 11 minutes of total play. Despite limited statistical impact, his presence added depth to the Tigers’ roster.

Young's academic excellence was recognized when he was named to the SEC First-Year Academic Honor Roll in 2024, alongside teammate Mike Williams.

== Personal life ==
Young has pursued interests in music and videography. He is self-taught on the piano and plays both acoustic and electric guitar, occasionally performing covers of artists such as Billy Joel and Elton John. He has also created video content, including a highlight reel documenting LSU's basketball team trip to the Bahamas, which he shared on social media. His activity on TikTok has attracted significant viewership, contributing to his personal brand and resulting in Name, Image, and Likeness (NIL) opportunities. Young was featured on The Money Game: LSU, a six-part NIL-focused docuseries by Prime Video that followed him, Jayden Daniels, Angel Reese, Flau'jae Johnson, Livvy Dunne, and Alia Armstrong through LSU's 2023–24 sports season. The series was nominated for Outstanding Documentary Series (Serialized) at the 46th Sports Emmy Awards.

== Career statistics ==
Legend
GP	Games played	GS	Games started	MPG	Minutes per game
FG%	Field goal percentage	3P%	3-point field goal percentage	FT%	Free throw percentage
RPG	Rebounds per game	APG	Assists per game	SPG	Steals per game
BPG	Blocks per game	PPG	Points per game	**Bold**	Career high

=== College ===
Year	Team	GP	GS	MPG	FG%	3P%	FT%	RPG	APG	SPG	BPG	PPG
2024–25	LSU	9	9	1.3	0.0	0.0	0.0	0.0	0.2	1.4	1.4	0.1
**Career**												
