= Livvy Dunne =

American gymnast and influencer (born 2002)

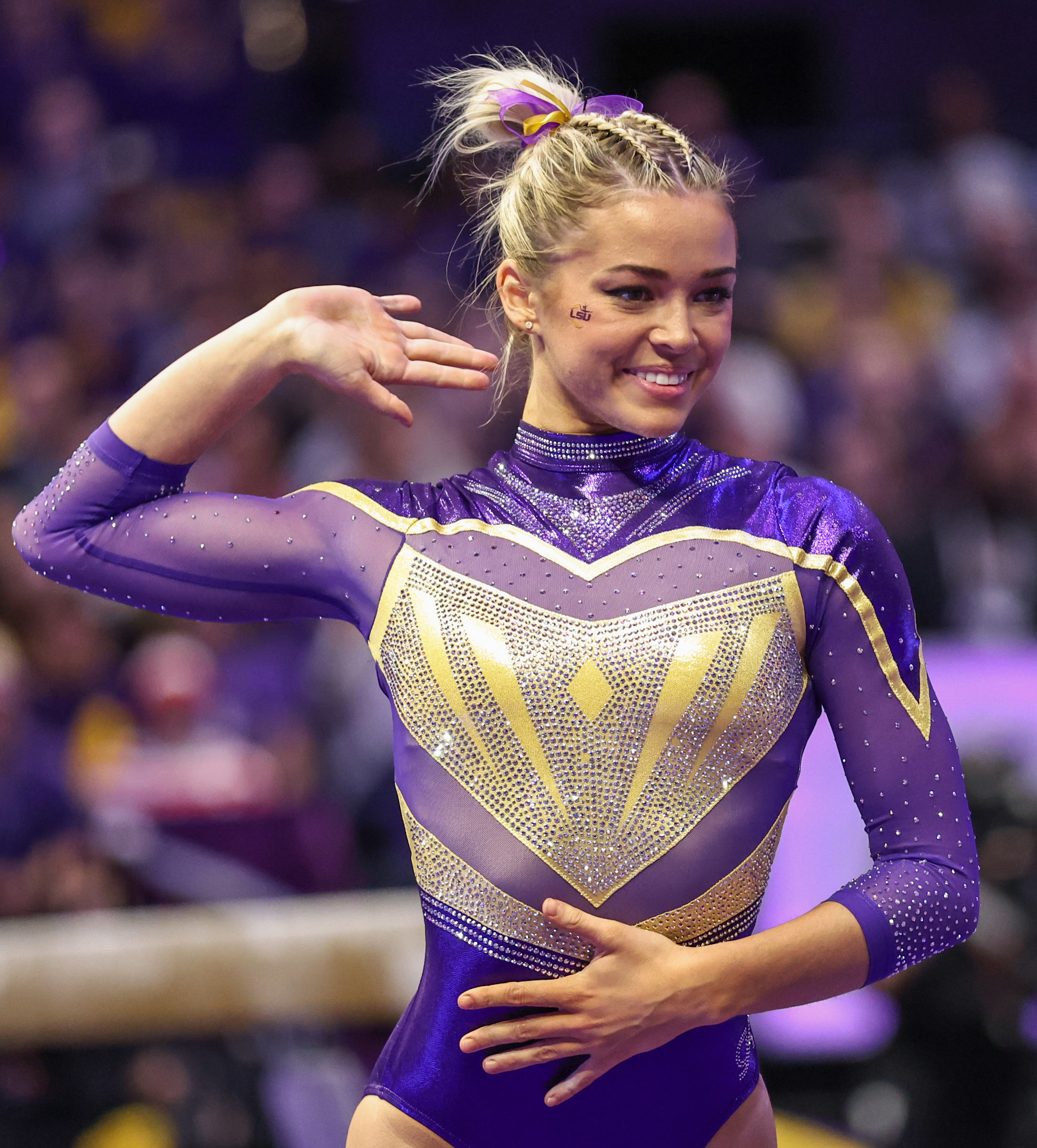
- Dunne with the LSU Tigers in 2025

Personal information
- Full name: Olivia Paige Dunne
- Nicknames: Livvy, Liv
- Born: October 1, 2002 (age 24) Westwood, New Jersey, U.S.
- Height: 5 ft 6.25 in (168 cm)

Gymnastics career
- Discipline: Women's artistic gymnastics
- Country represented: United States; (2017)
- College team: LSU Tigers (2021–2025)
- Club: ENA Paramus
- Head coach: Jay Clark
- Retired: April 17, 2025
Medal record
Representing Louisiana State Tigers
NCAA Championships
Gold medal – first place	2024 Fort Worth	Team

TikTok information
- Page: livvy
- Followers: 7.9 million (January 27, 2026)

Olivia Paige Dunne (born October 1, 2002) is an American actress, model, social media personality, and former artistic gymnast. She is currently part of the cast of Fox's Baywatch television series and is also a Sports Illustrated swimsuit model and former member of the LSU Tigers women's gymnastics team. In 2017, she was named as a member of the US Junior Women's National Team. Dunne has a social media following of over 10 million.

== Early life ==
Dunne was born on October 1, 2002, in Westwood, New Jersey, and grew up in Hillsdale, New Jersey. She is a devout follower of the Christian faith.

Dunne started her gymnastics training in 2005 at ENA Gymnastics in Paramus, New Jersey. By the time she was 14 years old, Dunne was homeschooled by her mother, using the Abeka Academy curriculum, while she spent her days training with her coach Craig Zappa at ENA Gymnastics.

== Gymnastics career ==
=== Junior elite ===
Dunne made her elite debut at the 2014 American Classic where she finished 28th in the all-around. She next competed at the U.S. Classic where she placed 12th in the all-around. In 2015, Dunne re-qualified for elite status at the WOGA Classic, where she earned a qualifying score of 52.750 and placed fifth. She next competed at the American Classic where she placed eighth and qualified to compete at the 2015 National Championships. Dunne competed at the U.S. Classic where she placed 24th in the last round. Dunne made her National Championships debut in 2015 where she placed 25th in the all-around.

Dunne competed at the 2016 American Classic where she finished 27th in the all-around. She next competed at the 2016 U.S. Classic where she finished 24th. Dunne concluded the season competing at the 2016 National Championships where she finished 12th in the all-around. She also placed eighth on balance beam and sixth on floor exercise. In March 2017, Dunne was selected for the team to compete at the 2017 City of Jesolo Trophy; as a result she was added to the National Team for the first time. She made her international debut there and placed sixth in the all-around. Dunne competed at the 2017 U.S. Classic in July where she finished fifth in the all-around. At the 2017 National Championships, Dunne finished ninth in the all-around.

=== Senior elite ===
Dunne turned senior in 2018. Although the United States did not send a team, Dunne represented her club at the 2018 City of Jesolo Trophy. She finished 15th in the all-around. She competed at the 2018 U.S. Classic only on uneven bars due to an ankle injury. Dunne qualified to compete at the National Championships via petition. She ended up placing 18th in the all-around. Having not competed during the 2019 season in order to rest her injuries, Dunne officially signed her National Letter of Intent with Louisiana State University in November, starting in the 2020–21 season. Dunne qualified to the 2020 Nastia Liukin Cup after dropping down to Level 10. She ended up placing 11th.

=== NCAA ===
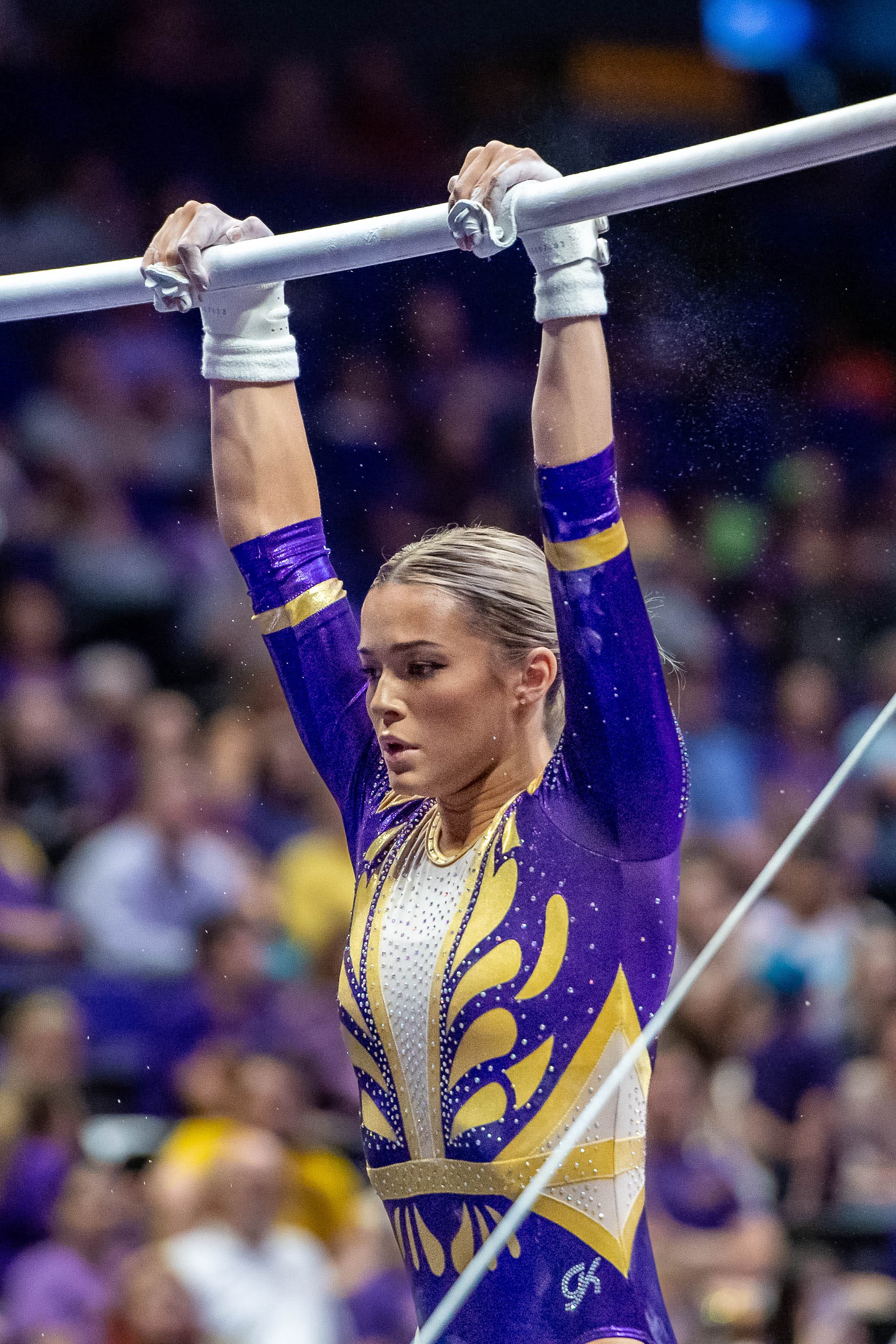
Dunne performing with the LSU Tigers, 2024

Dunne joined the LSU Tigers gymnastics team in 2020. During the 2020–21 season, she competed on the uneven bars in every regular-season meet. She made her NCAA debut in a meet against Arkansas, scoring 9.875. She entered the postseason with an NQS of 9.9 on bars. At the SEC Championships, she contributed an uneven bars score of 9.9 to LSU's second-place team finish. At the NCAA Championships semi-finals, she again scored 9.9 on bars; LSU did not advance to the finals.

The next season, Dunne again competed on the uneven bars in every regular-season meet and also competed five times on the floor exercise. She matched her career-high of 9.925 on the uneven bars during the opening meet against Centenary. She earned a score of 9.800 in her collegiate debut on floor on January 28. At the SEC Championships, she contributed an uneven bars score of 9.875, but LSU was forced to count a fall on that event and finished in fifth place overall. At the NCAA regional semifinals, she contributed scores of 9.85 on uneven bars and 9.9 on floor exercise. LSU suffered two uncharacteristic falls on balance beam and as a result was eliminated from the postseason during the first round of regionals, failing to qualify for the national championship as a team for the first time since 2011. After missing much of the 2022–23 season due to various injuries including two torn labrums, a torn bicep, and a stress reaction in her leg, Dunne made her season debut on February 24 against Alabama, scoring a 9.825 on the uneven bars.

During the 2023–24 season, Dunne competed eight routines on floor exercise, matching her career-high of 9.9 twice. She also competed on the uneven bars twice, including at the SEC Championships, where LSU won the team title. At the NCAA Championships, the Tigers won their first national championship title in program history.

Dunne confirmed that she intended to take her fifth year of eligibility that the COVID-19 pandemic had granted NCAA athletes. She competed in the first four meets of the 2024–2025 season before sustaining an avulsion fracture in her kneecap, ending her NCAA career.

Dunne announced her retirement from gymnastics on April 17, 2025.

== Acting career ==
In March 2026, Dunne was cast in a recurring role as Grace in a Baywatch reboot.

== Social media fame ==
Dunne joined the social media platform TikTok in 2020. Initially she posted videos of her gymnastics but later started posting videos of other areas of her life as well. By February 2023, Dunne was the most-followed NCAA athlete on social media, with more than 8 million followers on TikTok and 5 million on Instagram.

On July 2, 2021, the NCAA changed its rule to allow its athletes to earn money from their name, image, and likeness (NIL). Dunne was projected to earn more than any other collegiate athlete due to her large social-media platform, which was a combined five million followers across both Instagram and TikTok at the time of the rule change. In August, Dunne announced that she signed with WME Sports, becoming their first NIL athlete. A month later, she announced her first exclusive brand partnership with activewear brand Vuori.

As of May 2023, Dunne was the highest-valued women's college athlete with an estimated NIL valuation of $3.3 million, which led to endorsement deals with Grubhub, Vuori, Bodyarmor, and American Eagle Outfitters. In February 2023, she stated during an appearance on the morning program Today that her endorsement deals total seven figures.

On January 6, 2023, a large group of fans showed up to LSU's opening meet of the season at Utah to support Dunne. Some of these fans were reportedly harassing members of both gymnastics teams as well as journalists both during and after the meet. As a result of this, LSU hired additional security staff for the team and implemented increased safety measures including disallowing LSU gymnasts to go into the stands after a meet. Following the incident, Dunne posted a statement to Twitter requesting that her fans be more respectful.

On February 27, 2023, Dunne posted a paid-sponsorship video to TikTok promoting Caktus.AI with the caption, "Needing to get my creativity flowing for my essay due at midnight". The video showed her generating an essay using the service, with the camera then panning to show a shocked expression on the star, concluding with the caption "Caktus.AI > ChatGPT". LSU issued a statement saying, "At LSU, our professors and students are empowered to use technology for learning and pursuing the highest standards of academic integrity. However, using AI to produce work that a student then represents as one's own could result in a charge of academic misconduct, as outlined in the Code of Student Conduct."

In July 2023, Dunne revealed that she had received more than $500,000 for a single social media post online. Later that month, Dunne announced that she had partnered with Bayou Traditions to launch The Livvy Fund, a program that will connect female student athletes at LSU with top brands to secure NIL endorsement deals.

Dunne was featured in the 2023 and 2024 editions of the Sports Illustrated Swimsuit Issue. For the 2025 edition she was selected as one of four cover models alongside Lauren Chan, Salma Hayek, and fellow gymnast Jordan Chiles.

In 2024, Dunne was added to the Forbes 30 under 30 list.

In 2025, Dunne was named in Time magazine’s inaugural “TIME100 Creators” list - branded by the publication as the 100 most influential digital voices.

== Personal life ==
Dunne with Paul Skenes at the United States Fleet Activities Yokosuka in 2026

Dunne is dating professional baseball pitcher Paul Skenes, a former player for the LSU baseball team. She was in attendance for his debut with the Pittsburgh Pirates in 2024. Both Dunne and Skenes are publicly committed to the Christian faith.

Dunne was featured on The Money Game: LSU, a six-part NIL-focused docuseries by Prime Video that followed her, Jayden Daniels, Angel Reese, Flau'jae Johnson, Alia Armstrong, and Trace Young through LSU's 2023–24 sports season. The series was nominated for Outstanding Documentary Series (Serialized) at the 46th Sports Emmy Awards.

In August 2024, Dunne posted a video reading from the Bible, with the caption "on repeat in my brain", with the video attracting both criticism and support for her religious faith. According to reports, Dunne is "no stranger to mixing devotionals and Scripture into her feed, openly crediting her Christian beliefs for keeping her steady through the grind of NCAA competitions."

== Competitive history ==
Competitive history of Olivia Dunne
Year	Event	Team	AA	VT	UB	BB	FX
2014	American Classic		28	31	25	16	18
2014	U.S. Classic		33	36	35	29	20
2015	WOGA Classic		5				
2015	American Classic		8	18	15	9	6
2015	U.S. Classic		24	34	30	14	12
2015	U.S. National Championships		25	27	23	23	21
2016	American Classic		27	26	26	22	20
2016	U.S. Classic		24	33	23	20	13
2016	U.S. National Championships		12	22	21	8	6
2017	City of Jesolo Trophy	1st place, gold medalist(s)	6				
2017	American Classic				12	6	
2017	U.S. Classic		5	22	11	6	6
2017	U.S. National Championships		9	15	9	7	8
2018	City of Jesolo Trophy		15				
2018	U.S. Classic				15		
2018	U.S. National Championships		18		17	20	19
2020	Nastia Liukin Cup		11				
2021	SEC Championships	2nd place, silver medalist(s)			5		
2021	NCAA Championships	6			9		
2022	SEC Championships	5			17		
2023	SEC Championships	3rd place, bronze medalist(s)			28		
2024	SEC Championships	1st place, gold medalist(s)			41		
2024	NCAA Championships	1st place, gold medalist(s)					

== Filmography ==
List of television shows, showing year aired, character played and notes
Year	TV show	Role	Notes	Ref.
2024	The Money Game: LSU	Herself	Main role (Season 1–present)	
2027	Baywatch	Grace	Recurring role	
