= The Seat (film) =

2025 English documentary short film

- Directed by: Kyle Thrash
- Produced by: Jeremy Barrett; Stephen Plesniak; Meghan Walsh; Amanda Naseem
- Cinematography: Patrick Golan
- Edited by: Gabriel Cullen; Mark Imgrund; F. Michael Young
- Music by: Giosuè Greco
- Production company: RadicalMedia
- Distributed by: Netflix
- Release date: May 5, 2025
- Running time: 40 minutes
- Country: United States
- Languages: English; Italian

The Seat is a 2025 American documentary short film directed by Kyle Thrash and produced by RadicalMedia in collaboration with WhatsApp and the Mercedes-AMG Petronas Formula One Team. The 40-minute film documents the Mercedes team's decision to promote 18-year-old Italian driver Andrea Kimi Antonelli to Formula One for the 2025 season, following Lewis Hamilton's move to Ferrari. Released on Netflix on May 5, 2025, it debuted in the top 10 on the platform in over 25 countries. The film covers internal discussions and strategic considerations led by Team Principal and CEO Toto Wolff, focusing on Antonelli's transition to Formula One.

== Plot ==
The Seat follows the Mercedes-AMG Petronas team’s decision to replace Lewis Hamilton with 18-year-old unknown Andrea Kimi Antonelli for the 2025 Formula One season. The film follows the team and driver through internal team communications via WhatsApp, showing private negotiations between Toto Wolff, engineers, strategists, and Antonelli. It tracks Antonelli's intense preparation, including driving training, simulator sessions, physical workouts, and emotional heart-warming moments with his family and team.

== Cast ==
- Andrea Kimi Antonelli
- Toto Wolff
- James Allison
- Marco Antonelli
- Peter Bonnington
- Alex Jacques
- Laura Winter

== Production ==
The Seat was produced by RadicalMedia, WhatsApp, Mercedes-AMG Petronas, and Modern Arts, with Kyle Thrash (The Turnaround) as director. Filming took place in Brackley, United Kingdom in 2024 and Bologna, Italy, Canary Islands and Jerez, Spain in 2025, capturing Antonelli’s testing sessions, his FP1 appearance at Monza, a video call confirming his 2025 contract, team discussions, pitstop practices, seat fitting, and family moments. The film premiered at the 2025 Miami Grand Prix at the Faena Forum. It was Antonelli's first pole in F1 and made him the youngest driver ever to secure a pole position in any F1 format.

== Release ==
The Seat was released on Netflix on May 5, 2025.

== Reception ==
The Seat received positive reviews. Midgard Times rated it 8/10, noting its look at Formula One’s complexities and calling its tone polished. EverythingF1 gave it 4/5, citing genuinely brilliant insights into Antonelli’s journey, especially post-Monza FP1 crash.
