= Zambezi (disambiguation) =

The Zambezi (sometimes spelled Zambesi) is the fourth largest river in Africa, and the largest to flow into the Indian Ocean.

Zambezi may also refer to:

== Geography ==
- Zambezi, Zambia, a town in the North-Western Province of Zambia
- Zambezi Escarpment, escarpments forming both sides of the rift valley in which lie the middle Zambezi River and Lake Kariba
- Zambezi District, a district of Zambia, located in North-Western Province
  - Zambezi East, a constituency of the National Assembly of Zambia
  - Zambezi West, a constituency of the National Assembly of Zambia
- Zambezi Region, administrative region of Namibia, located at the end of the northeastern tip of the country

== Transport ==
- Air Zambezi, an airline in Zimbabwe
- Zambezi Airlines, a privately owned airline based in Lusaka, Zambia
- Zambezi Sawmills Railway or Mulobezi Railway, a railway in southern Zambia

== Wildlife ==
- Zambezi shark or Bull shark, a shark common to warm, shallow waters
- Zambezi flapshell turtle, a species of softshell turtle in the family Trionychidae
- Zambezi indigobird, also known as the twinspot indigobird or green indigobird, is a species of bird in the family Viduidae

== Other uses ==
- Zambezi (beer), Zimbabwe's national beer
- Zambezi Sun, a Thoroughbred racehorse who competes in France
- O Zambezi, the fifth album by New Zealand / Australian rock band Dragon
- "Zambezi", a song composed by Nico Carstens
- A fictional country in the 1991 comedy film King Ralph
- Zambezi (advertising agency)
- Zambezi Industrial Mission

== See also ==
- Lower Zambezi National Park, a park on the north bank of the Zambezi River in south-eastern Zambia
- Upper Zambezi labeo, a fish of the genus Labeo
- Upper Zambezi yellowfish, a fish found in the Zambezi River and common to southern Africa
- Zambezi bream, a species of fish
- Zambezi National Park, a park on the south bank of the Zambezi River in north-western Zimbabwe
- Zambezi Zinger, a roller coaster at Worlds of Fun in Kansas City, Missouri, United States
