= Kyle Thrash =

American documentary and music video director

- Born: Philadelphia, Pennsylvania, U.S.
- Occupations: Director, writer, producer
- Years active: 2000–present

Kyle Thrash is an American documentary and music video director.

== Early life and education ==
Thrash was born in Philadelphia, Pennsylvania, and graduated from Drexel University in Philadelphia in 2011 with a B.S. in film and video.

== Career ==
He has directed music videos for The Lumineers, Modest Mouse, Lewis Capaldi, Rainbow Kitten Surprise, Every Time I Die, The Menzingers, Modern Baseball, and more.

In 2019, Thrash directed the feature documentary, Maybe Next Year, which premiered at the Philadelphia Film Festival following Philadelphia Eagles Fans during the 2017 Super Bowl winning season. In 2022, he co-directed the MSNBC Short, The Sentence of Michael Thompson, along with Haley Elizabeth Anderson about the longest current serving non-violent offender in Michigan State history, which premiered at South by Southwest and was nominated for an News and Documentary Emmy Award. Recently he directed the Netflix documentary short, The Turnaround, with co-director Ben Proudfoot, about the Trea Turner standing ovation which premiered at the Telluride Film Festival in 2024 and was nominated for Two Critics' Choice Documentary Awards.

In 2025, Thrash directed the Netflix documentary short, The Seat, in collaboration with WhatsApp and the Mercedes-AMG Petronas Formula 1 Team. Premiering on May 5, 2025, it follows the promotion of 18-year-old Andrea Kimi Antonelli to a Formula 1 seat, capturing key decisions by Toto Wolff.

== Select filmography ==
Year	Title	Contribution	Note
2025	The Seat	Director	Documentary short
2024	The Turnaround	Director	Documentary short
2022	The Sentence of Michael Thompson	Director	Documentary short
2019	Maybe Next Year	Director	Documentary

=== Selected music videos ===
Year	Title	Artist/Band	Roles
2021	"Brightside"	The Lumineers	Director
2021	"We Are Between"	Modest Mouse	Director
2020	"Before You Go"	Lewis Capaldi	Director
2017	"After the Party"	The Menzingers	
2018	"Hide"	Rainbow Kitten Surprise	Director
2018	"Map Change"	Every Time I Die	Director
2014	"Your Graduation"	Modern Baseball	Director

== Awards and nominations ==
Year	Result	Award	Category	Work	Ref.
2025	Won	Sports Emmy Awards	Outstanding Short Documentary	The Turnaround	
2024	Nominated	Critics' Choice Documentary Awards	Best Short Documentary	The Turnaround	
2024	Nominated	Critics' Choice Documentary Awards	Best Sports Documentary	The Turnaround	
2023	Nominated	News & Documentary Emmy Awards	Outstanding Short Documentary	The Sentence of Michael Thompson	
2022	Won	South by Southwest	Documentary Shorts Competition	The Sentence of Michael Thompson	
2022	Won	Hamptons International Film Festival	Audience Award: Short Film	The Sentence of Michael Thompson	
2022	Won	Palm Springs International ShortFest	Best Documentary Short	The Sentence of Michael Thompson	
2022	Won	Palm Springs International ShortFest	Audience Award: Best Documentary Short	The Sentence of Michael Thompson	
2019	Won	Philadelphia Film Festival	Honorable Mention for Best Direction	Maybe Next Year	
