= Zambezi (advertising agency) =

Marketing agency in Culver City, California

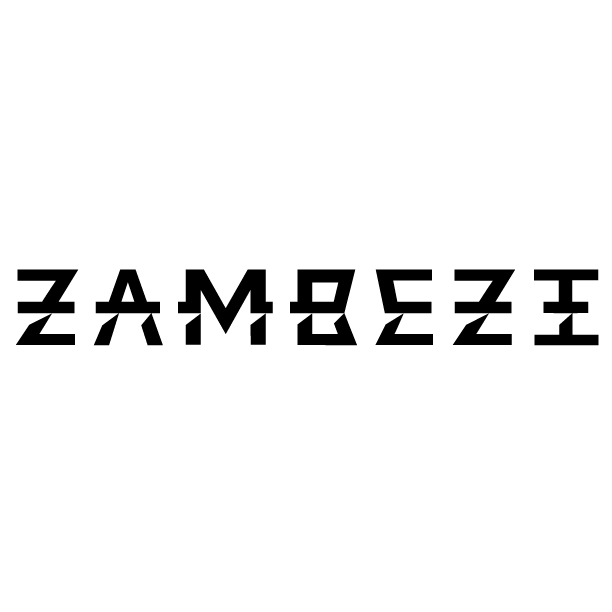
- Industry: Advertising; Marketing; Entertainment
- Founded: Venice Beach, CA 2006
- Headquarters: Culver City, CA, United States
- Area served: United States
- Website: www.zmbz.com

Zambezi is an advertising and marketing agency in Culver City, California. Founded in 2006 in Venice Beach by former Wieden & Kennedy executives, the agency originally specialized in sports marketing. After buying out its principal owner, the agency’s management team shifted its focus to communications for consumer brands, beyond sports and entertainment. They also moved their headquarters to Culver City, and in 2020, opened a Minneapolis location.

== Recognition ==
Zambezi was named to Inc. magazine's list of 500/500 Fastest Growing Private Companies in 2011, 2012, 2013, 2014, 2019, 2023, 2024, and 2026, and recognized as an Advertising Age Small Agency of the Year in 2011, 2016, and 2026.

Zambezi also made the list of 100 Largest Woman-Owned Business in Los Angeles County by the Los Angeles Business Journal in 2016 and 2015, and was named Disruptor of the Year in 2022.

In 2016, the agency’s campaign for Stance, "Shop With the Force", won a One Show Gold Pencil, an Advertising Age Digital Campaign of the Year Silver Award and a Gold Lion at the Cannes International Festival of Advertising.

In 2024, the agency Under Armour campaign "Protect This House" earned multiple Clio Awards, including a Bronze Clio Music Award for Use of Music in Film & Video, Silver Clio Award for Film Craft Original Music, and Bronze Clio Sport Award in Film Craft.

Also in 2024, Zambezi production arm FIN Studios' ESPN x State Farm campaign "Inner Baller, Full Court Press" won multiple Silver Clio Sport Awards in Branded Entertainment/Content, Athlete Storytelling and Branded Entertainment/Content, Partnerships & Sponsorships, as well as a 46th Sports Emmy Awards nomination for Outstanding Promotional Announcement. In the same year, FIN's NFL Flag campaign "Let's Play" also earned a 46th Sports Emmy Awards nomination for Outstanding Public Service Content.

FIN Studios and Zambezi created the Tennis Channel series “Warm and Fuzzy”, hosted by comedian and former tennis pro Michael Kosta (The Daily Show), which premiered its second season in mid-2023. The production earned an Indie Agency News: Top 40, Design award, a ThinkLA IDEA Award for Best Branded Content, two Shorty Awards for Branded Content and Sports, and a Silver Clio Sport award in Branded Content & Entertainment.

In 2025, Zambezi and LPL Financial LLC teamed up with Oscar-nominated actress Anna Kendrick to launch the integrated national consumer campaign, “What If You Could?”, which spanned a TV spot and linear, digital, audio, social, OOH, print, and search advertising, and was the first from LPL to directly engage the consumer in the company’s history. The campaign went on to win a 2025 MediaPost OMMA Award in the Financial Services category, and LPL Financial was named a 2025 ThinkAdvisor Luminary in Excellence in Marketing and PR.

In Summer 2025, hydration brand Liquid I.V. and Zambezi stopped Times Square traffic with “I.V. O’Clock”, a stunt that controlled all 30 Times Square billboards on June 4, 2025, from 3:55 P.M. to 4:25 P.M. At 4 P.M., I.V. O’Clock was introduced across every billboard with the message: “4 O’clock is now I.V. O’clock. Time to Hydrate.” 50 delivery robots descended in sequence and dispersed water bottles and Liquid I.V. samples to the crowd. The campaign won two 2025 MediaPost OMMA Awards in the categories Digital OOH and Interactive: Campaign or Single Execution.

Among its leaders, CEO and Principal Jean Freeman was selected as an Ad Age Leading Women Honoree in 2025, joined by FIN Studios Content Producer Angela Wells, who was selected as an Ad Age Rising Star Honoree. Zambezi President Laura Stayt was also chosen as a 2026 She Runs It Working Mother of the Year. Scale by Zambezi Chief Media Officer Grace Teng was selected as a 2024 Campaign U.S. 40 Over 40 honoree.

== Campaigns ==
The agency has created campaigns for Autotrader, Beats by Dre, ESPN, Health-Ade Kombucha, Liquid I.V., LPL Financial, The LA Rams, The Minnesota Timberwolves, Nex Playground, NFL Flag, Popchips, Smartwater, Stance, State Farm, TaylorMade, Tennis Channel, Traeger, Under Armour, UKG, and The Venetian, among others.

== IP ==
In 2025, Zambezi launched a proprietary AI model called the Zambezi Brand Performance Gap™, which provides a holistic brand health score against top competitors across product, business, media, culture, and consumer categories, revealing actionable marketing opportunities. The diagnostic offers clear insight into brand performance and pinpoints a brand’s progress toward a billion-dollar revenue.
