= Caden Davis =

Caden Davis may refer to two college American football players:

- Caden Davis (placekicker) (born 2001), a placekicker at Ole Miss
- Caden Davis (defensive end) (born 2004), a defensive end formerly with Ohio State known for his social media following
