= Alia Armstrong =

American athlete (born 2000)

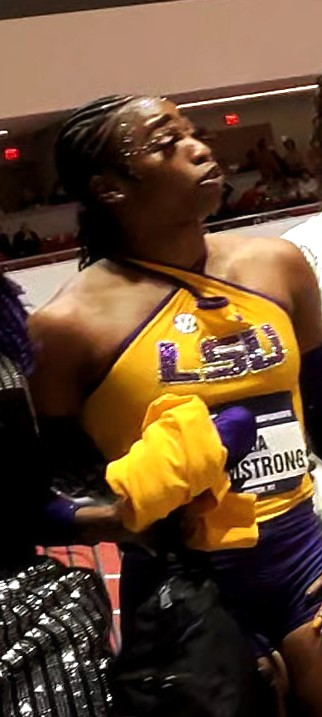
- Armstrong in 2024

Personal information
- Nationality: American
- Born: 28 December 2000 (age 25) New Orleans, Louisiana, U.S.

Sport
- Sport: Track and field
- Event: 100 meters hurdles

Alia Armstrong (born 28 December 2000) is an American hurdler. She won the 100 metres hurdles at the 2026 USA Championships and the 60 metres hurdles at the 2026 USA Indoor Championships. She had a fourth place finish representing the United States in the 100 metres hurdles at the 2022 World Athletics Championships.

== Biography ==
Armstrong attended St. Katharine Drexel Preparatory School in New Orleans. In 2018, she ran 8.33 for the 60 metres hurdles to set a new Galleria Games meet record, finishing ahead of Jasmine Jones.

Armstrong won the 100 metres hurdles at the 2022 NCAA Outdoor Championship in Eugene, Oregon in June 2022, running a new personal best 12.55 seconds in the semi-finals, and then 12.57 in the final, competing for Louisiana State University. This came after Armstrong initially had a hard time in 2022 when she was disqualified from the SEC Indoor Championships and disqualified again at the NCAA Indoor Championships. Armstrong placed third in the 100 metres hurdles at the 2022 USATF Championships, also held in Eugene, running a personal best 12.47 seconds in the final. With this performance Armstrong was selected for the 2022 World Athletics Championships, again held in Eugene. In the heats of the World Championships Armstrong ran 12.48 to make the semi-finals on her major championship debut before finishing fourth in the final with a wind-assisted 12.31 second (+2.5 m/s).

Armstrong placed third in the 100 metres hurdles at the 2023 NCAA Outoor Championships, running a wind-assisted 12.49 seconds (+3.5 m/s) to finish behind Ackera Nugent and Masai Russell in Austin, Texas. Armstrong placed third in the 60 metres hurdles at the 2024 NCAA Indoor Championships, running 7.94 seconds to finish behind Jasmine Jones and Grace Stark in Boston, Massachusetts.

Armstrong won the 60 metres hurdles at the 2026 USA Indoor Track and Field Championships, finishing ahead of Danae Dyer in a time of 7.82 seconds. On 25 July, Armstrong won the 100-meter hurdles title at the 2026 USA Outdoor Track and Field Championships in New York in 12.38 seconds. In September, she was a finalist competing in the 100 m hurdles at the inaugural World Ultimate Championship in Budapest.

== Personal life ==
Armstrong was featured on The Money Game: LSU, a six-part NIL-focused docuseries by Prime Video that followed her, Jayden Daniels, Angel Reese, Flau'jae Johnson, Livvy Dunne, and Trace Young through LSU's 2023–24 sports season. The series was nominated for Outstanding Documentary Series (Serialized) at the 46th Sports Emmy Awards.
