= The Money Game: LSU =

2024 American documentary series

- Genre: Docuseries
- Starring: Jayden Daniels; Angel Reese; Flau'jae Johnson; Livvy Dunne; Alia Armstrong; Trace Young
- Music by: Mark Hadley; Malcolm Parson
- Original language: English
- No. of episodes: 6

Production
- Executive producers: Drea Cooper; Brendan Daw; Ross Dinerstein; Rebecca Evans
- Cinematography: Diana Matos; Bradley Credit
- Camera setup: Diana Matos
- Running time: 45 minutes
- Production companies: Campfire Studios; Axios Media; Jersey Legends Productions

Original release
- Network: Amazon Prime Video
- Release: September 10, 2024

The Money Game: LSU is an American docuseries that followed LSU Tiger student athletes Jayden Daniels, Angel Reese, Flau'jae Johnson, Livvy Dunne, Alia Armstrong, and Trace Young through their 2023–24 sports season and the impact of name, image, and likeness (NIL) contracts. The series premiered on Amazon Prime Video on September 10, 2024. The Money Game was nominated for Outstanding Documentary Series (Serialized) at the 46th Sports Emmy Awards.

== Synopsis ==
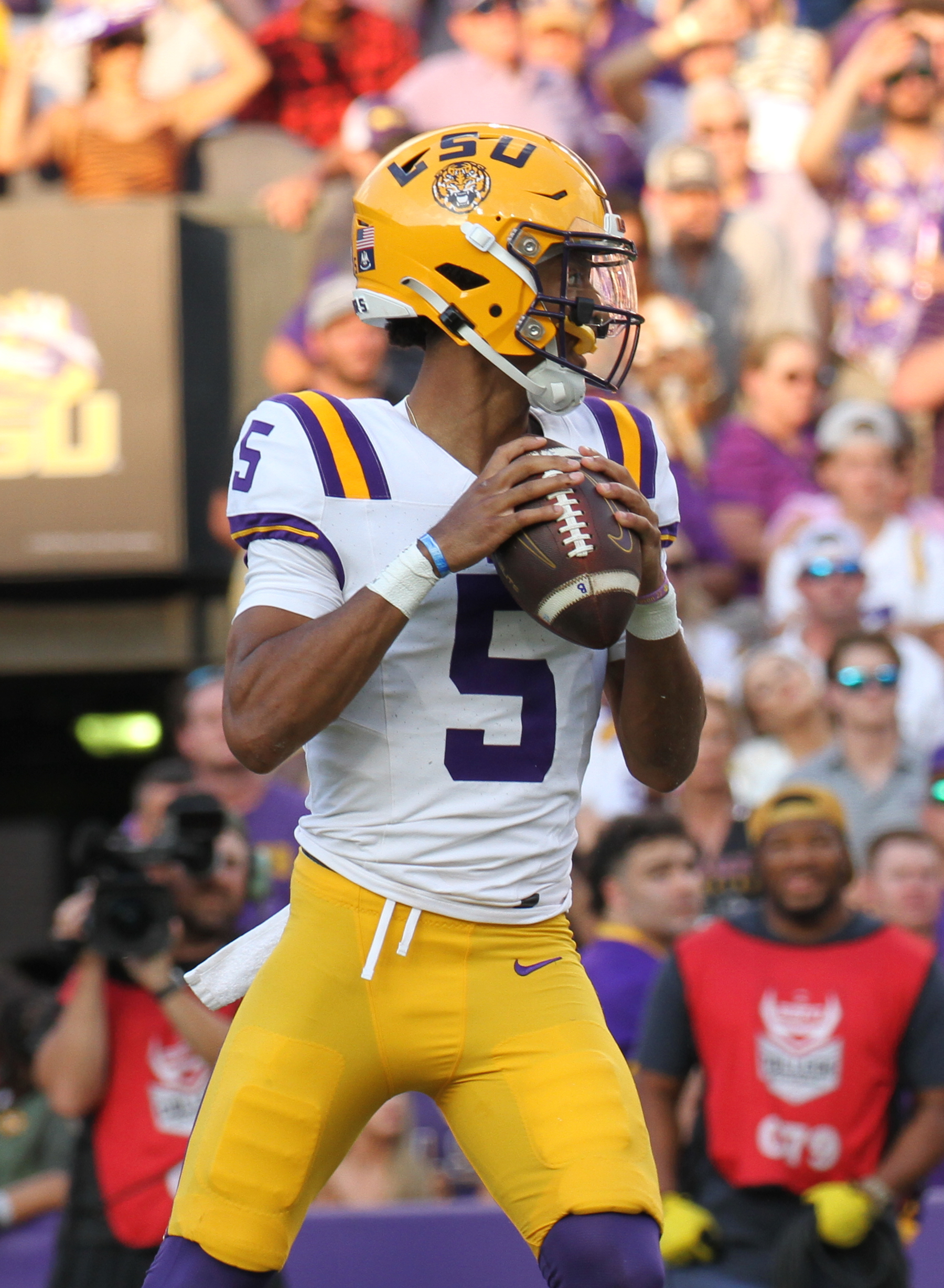
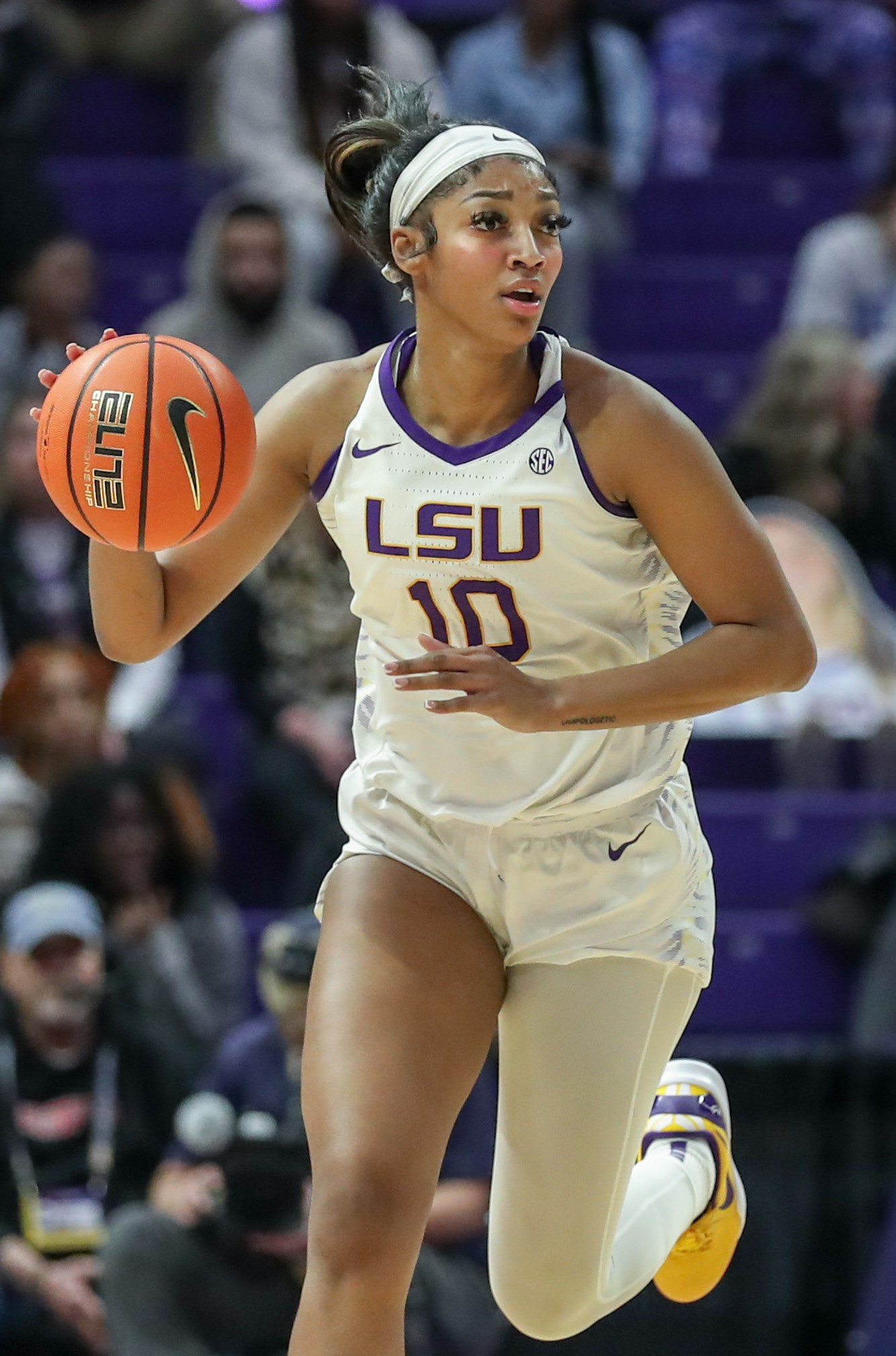
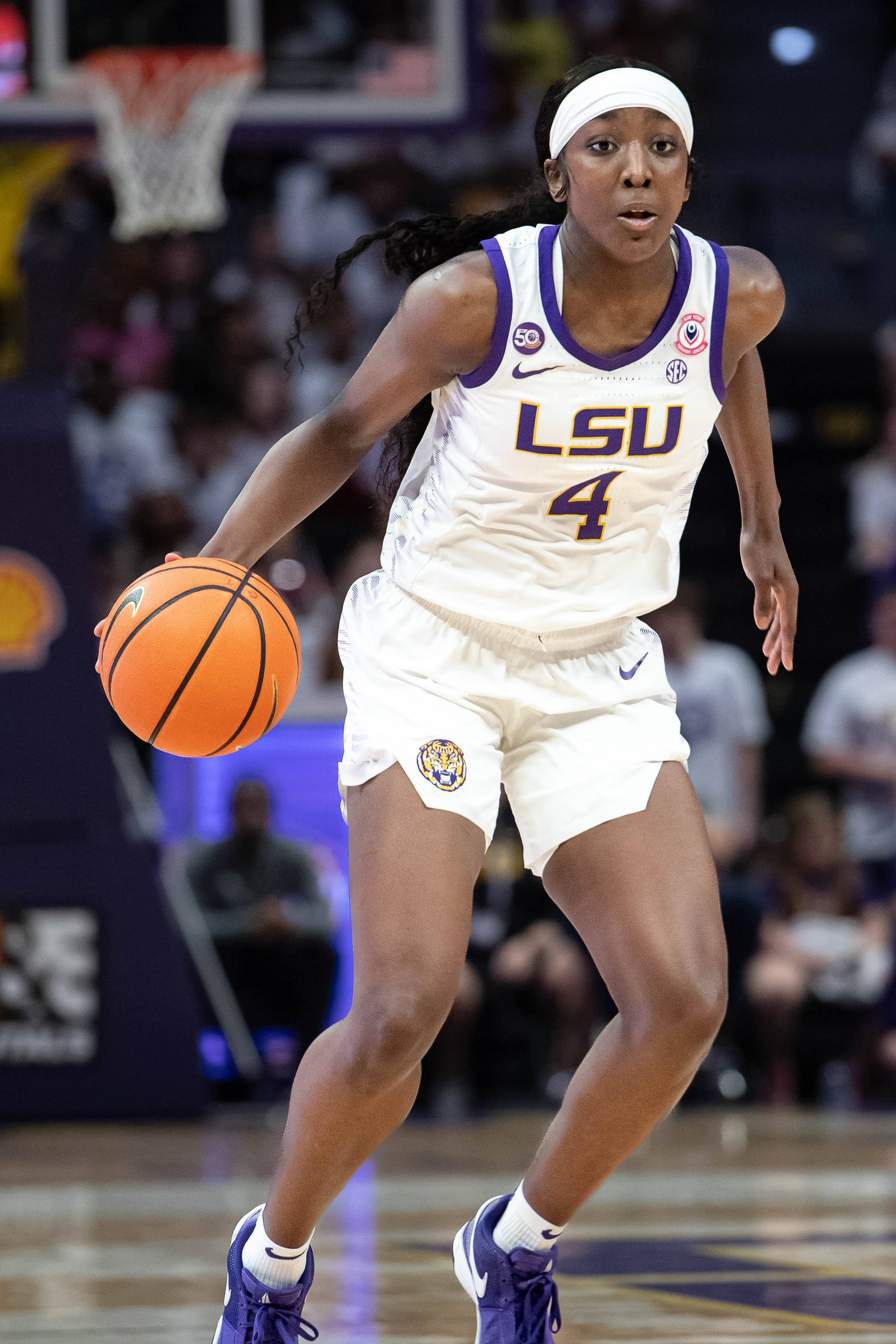
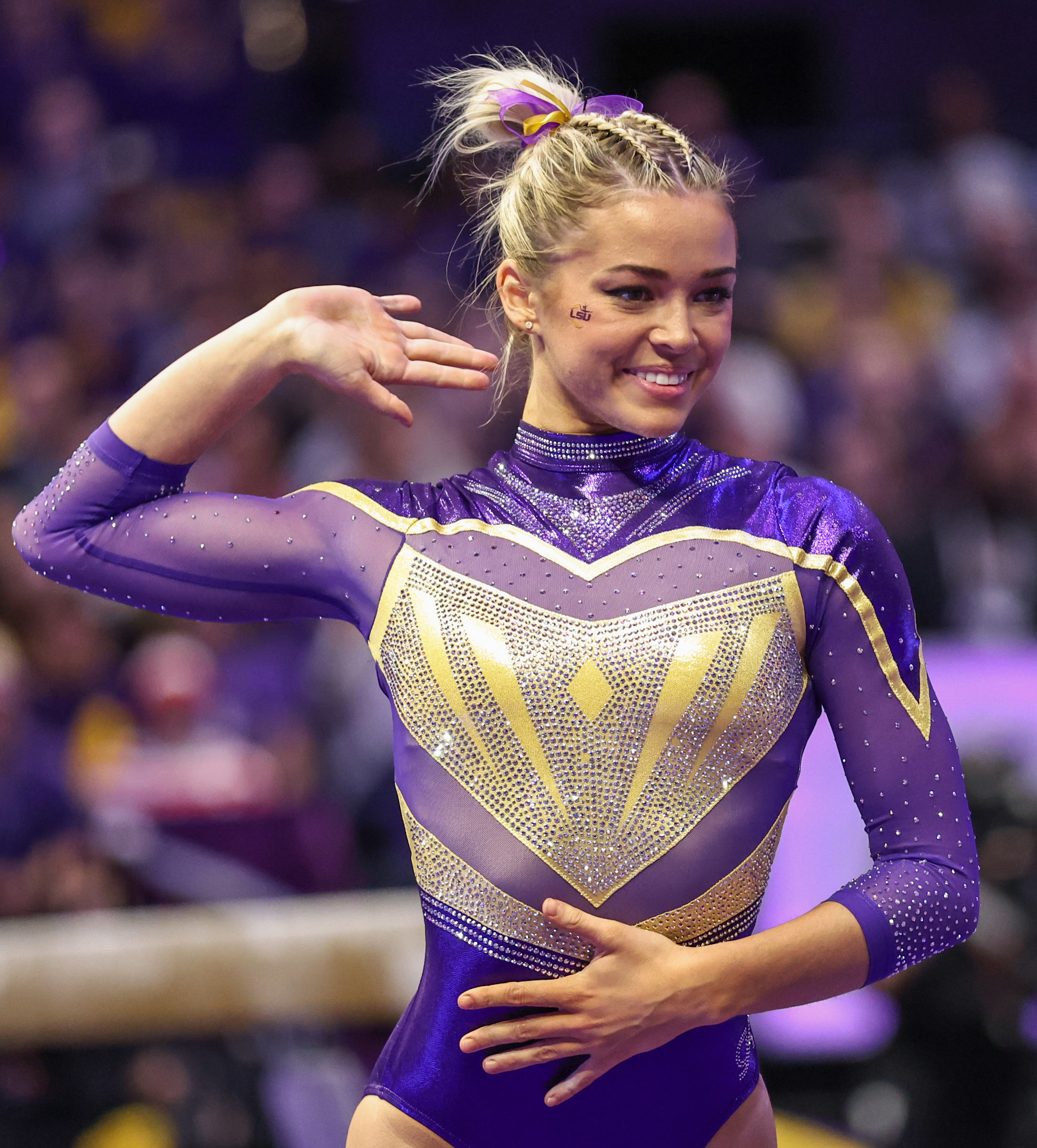
Football player Jayden Daniels, basketball teammates Angel Reese and Flau'jae Johnson, and gymnast Livvy Dunne were prominently featured

The series followed six LSU Tiger student athletes as they navigate the uncharted and often controversial world of name, image, and likeness (NIL) contracts. It delves into the dual nature of opportunity and pressure in college athletics, illustrating how NIL has turned student-athletes into public figures while subjecting them to increased expectations on and off the field.

Quarterback Jayden Daniels manages the demands of a Heisman Trophy campaign alongside his NFL goals. His final season is portrayed as both a personal challenge and a duty to the LSU community, highlighted by a decisive game against the Alabama Crimson Tide.

Angel Reese and Flau'jae Johnson feature in LSU women's basketball. Reese, recognized for her assertive personality and strong play, faces both support and criticism as she adjusts to media attention. Johnson, balancing a career as a rapper and athlete, demonstrates a new wave of athletes diversifying their brands beyond sports. Men's basketball player Trace Young deals with NIL challenges while seeking a breakthrough.

On the gymnastics team, Livvy Dunne contends with her roles as a social media figure and an athlete aiming for team success. Her story addresses the gendered scrutiny women face in the NIL era, managing online sexism while pursuing a championship in her senior year. Hurdler Alia Armstrong offers another view, managing injuries while pursuing Olympic goals and using NIL to raise her profile in a less prominent sport.

== Episodes ==
No. overall	No. in season	Title	Directed by	Written by	Original release date
1	1	"The Wild West"	Drea Cooper	Chelsea Coates	September 10, 2024
Name, image, and likeness (NIL) has transformed numerous college athletes into celebrities, but neither fame nor fortune can protect them from the pressure of competition. Gymnast and social media personality Livvy Dunne is determined to capture a championship in her senior year, while quarterback Jayden Daniels carries both his NFL ambitions as he prepares for a high-stakes clash with rival Alabama.
2	2	"The Price Just Went Up"	Drea Cooper	Chelsea Coates	September 10, 2024
LSU student-athletes experience the highs and lows of success, all while under the watchful eye of the public. Quarterback Jayden Daniels sees his Heisman aspirations slip away, while women's basketball players Angel Reese and Flau'jae Johnson rise to prominence, learning to navigate their growing stardom in women's sports.
3	3	"You Can't See Me"	Drea Cooper	Chelsea Coates	September 10, 2024
Livvy Dunne and the LSU gymnastics team aim to build early momentum in pursuit of a championship title. Meanwhile sprinter Alia Armstrong, with her sights set on the Olympics, faces uncertainty in her senior season due to a lingering injury. Controversy erupts as the sudden, unexplained absence of a key player from the women's basketball team sparks a wave of speculation and drama.
4	4	"Not Just an Athlete"	Drea Cooper	Chelsea Coates	September 10, 2024
As winter approaches and the Heisman Trophy presentation looms, Jayden Daniels fights to solidify his NFL future in his final college game. Meanwhile, Angel Reese makes a return to the court, turning heads with her bold performances both in games and in the media. Like Reese, Livvy Dunne faces the realities of online scrutiny, grappling with gender disparities that have surfaced in the NIL era.
5	5	"The Bag Man"	Drea Cooper	Chelsea Coates	September 10, 2024
Behind the scenes of NIL deals, booster collectives drive fierce fundraising efforts. Angel Reese debates between turning pro or staying for another season, while Livvy Dunne battles to secure her spot on the gymnastics roster. Meanwhile, Alia Armstrong's NIL opportunities are featured.
6	6	"Love of the Game"	Drea Cooper	Chelsea Coates	September 10, 2024
LSU athletes confront new challenges as NIL regulations continue to shift. Angel Reese and her team face off in a rivalry against Caitlin Clark of the Iowa Hawkeyes, while Livvy Dunne competes for the SEC gymnastics title. Meanwhile, Jayden Daniels prepares for the 2024 NFL draft.

== Release ==
The Money Game: LSU premiered on Amazon Prime Video as a six-part series on September 10, 2024. with Amazon positioning the show within its expanding sports-focused slate.

In the run-up to release, Prime Video rolled out an official trailer and key art in mid-August 2024, highlighting storylines built around NIL-era opportunities and scrutiny for LSU athletes.

Ahead of streaming, LSU hosted a campus "gold carpet" premiere at the Pete Maravich Assembly Center on September 4, 2024, with appearances by several featured athletes.

== Reception ==
Scott Hines of Decider.com gave the series a positive review, stating The Money Game could've been dry, or limited in interest to only LSU fans. Instead, it's a sharp and balanced look at how dramatically NIL has changed the world of college athletics. The series was nominated for Outstanding Documentary Series (Serialized) at the 46th Sports Emmy Awards.
