= Caden Davis (defensive end) =

American football player (born 2004)

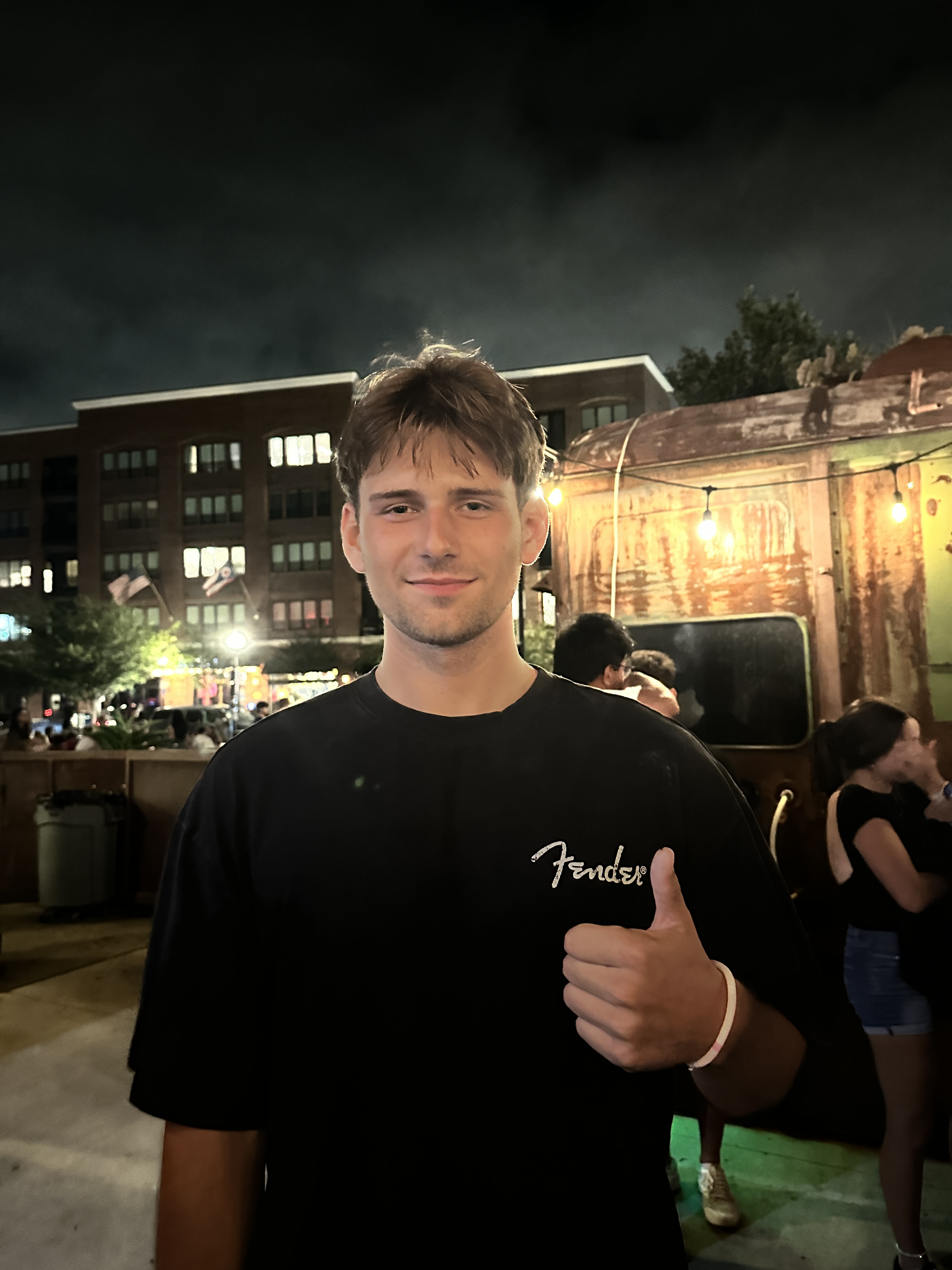
- Davis in 2025

No. 61
- Position: Defensive end

Personal information
- Born: June 8, 2004 (age 22); Mason, Ohio, U.S.
- Listed height: 6 ft 4 in (1.93 m)
- Listed weight: 235 lb (107 kg)

Career information
- High school: William Mason (Mason, Ohio)
- College: Ohio State (2023–2024)
- Stats at ESPN

Caden Davis (born June 8, 2004) is an American football player who was a defensive end for the Ohio State Buckeyes from 2022 to 2025. Davis, though never seeing the field during his time for the Buckeyes, became one of the most prominent players on social media due to behind-the-scenes content he made and published, particularly on TikTok and Instagram.

On January 15, 2025, the University announced that Davis was dismissed from the Ohio State Football Team. Though he was later reported to be off of the team for several weeks, no official reason was released by the University in its statement.

== Early life ==
Caden Davis was born on June 8, 2004 and grew up in Mason, Ohio, a suburb of Cincinnati. He played for the William Mason High School football team as a defensive end and defensive tackle, and he was further named as an All-Ohio honorable mention.

== College football career ==
Davis committed to the Ohio State Buckeyes in the spring of 2022. Davis also received offers from various other schools including Columbia, Bucknell, Dayton, Army, Navy, and Georgetown. As a scholar athlete, Davis was a marketing major.

Davis never played in a game during his time at Ohio State.

== Social media ==
Davis' social media following is prevalent, with over 275,000 followers on TikTok and more than 100,000 on Instagram. Davis' content covered life as a member of Ohio State's football team, as well as featuring campus events involving Ohio State students.

=== 2025 Cotton Bowl video ===
During Ohio State's trip to the January 2025 Cotton Bowl Classic, Davis posted a video falsely alluding that he was at the Cotton Bowl for that matchup. It was later revealed that the video Davis posted was primarily made of footage from Ohio State's previous trip to the Cotton Bowl against Missouri in 2023. Buckeye offensive lineman George Fitzpatrick commented on the video with "You don't play here"; the video was since deleted.

== Dismissal from Ohio State ==
On January 15, 2025, Ohio State's sports information director for football Jerry Emig confirmed that Davis was no longer part of the team. It was later revealed that Davis was off of the team for several weeks, and that as of January 18, his TikTok page still claimed he was a "DE @ OSU". At the time of publication in Ohio State's student newspaper The Lantern, the first outlet to report on Davis' dismissal, the reason for him being cut was unconfirmed, though Davis later announced on his Instagram page that the cuts were due to both personal reasons and NCAA rules. The announcement that Davis was cut from the team occurred less than a week prior to the 2025 College Football Playoff National Championship, where the Buckeyes would play the Notre Dame Fighting Irish in Atlanta.

Many outlets covering Davis' dismissal believed that the Cotton Bowl video was one of the reasons why he was cut from the team, and the announcement of his dismissal so close to the national championship game fed into mysteries regarding his departure from the team. Emig declined to elaborate further about the reasoning regarding Davis' dismissal. The Plain Dealer of Cleveland speculated that the class action settlement in House v. NCAA would have implemented roster cuts and affected Davis' status with the team.

== Personal life ==
Davis is an active enthusiast of photography, and has traveled to every state in the US except for Alaska, Hawaii, and North Dakota.
