= Full Court Press (TV series) =

American documentary series about women's basketball

- Genre: Sports; Documentary
- Directed by: Kristen Lappas (season 1); Nikki Spetseris (season 2)
- Starring: Caitlin Clark; Kamilla Cardoso; Kiki Rice; Hannah Hidalgo; Flau'jae Johnson; Kiki Iriafen
- Country of origin: United States
- Original language: English
- No. of seasons: 2
- No. of episodes: 8

Production
- Executive producers: Peyton Manning; Caitlin Clark (season 1)
- Production companies: ESPN; Omaha Productions; Words & Pictures

Original release
- Network: ESPN+ ABC
- Release: May 11, 2024

Full Court Press is an American television documentary series developed for ESPN+. Produced by Omaha Productions and Words & Pictures in partnership with ESPN+, the series features women's college basketball players. Released on May 11, 2024, the first season starred Caitlin Clark, Kamilla Cardoso, and Kiki Rice. A second season season featuring Hannah Hidalgo, Flau'jae Johnson, and Kiki Iriafen was released in May 2025.

== Development ==
In collaboration with ESPN+, the first season was produced by Peyton Manning's production company Omaha Productions, and Words & Pictures. Manning and Clark were executive producers for the show. In an interview on The Pat McAfee Show, Manning explained that during the editing for Quarterback, the Omaha Productions team discussed working on a similar series relating to women's basketball. During pre-production, it was Clark who insisted the docuseries include other college players rather than only focus on her senior season. Kristen Lappas directed the series' first season.

The first season starred Caitlin Clark, Kamilla Cardoso, and Kiki Rice during their NCAA Division I women's basketball careers, specifically the 2023–24 season. Clark and Cardoso were featured during their senior seasons with the Iowa Hawkeyes and the South Carolina Gamecocks, respectively. Meanwhile, footage of Rice featured her during her sophomore season with the UCLA Bruins.

== Release and renewal ==
Announced on March 18, 2024, the series' first two episodes aired on May 11, 2024 on ESPN+ and ABC. Episodes three and four aired the following day. The series was available for streaming on Hulu from May 14 through June 12. The first season earned two Sports Emmy nominations at the 46th Sports Emmy Awards, including in the "Outstanding Sports Documentary Series: Serialized" category. "Inner Baller", a State Farm-sponsored promotion for the series, was nominated for "Outstanding Promotional Announcement".

On March 10, 2025, ESPN announced that Full Court Press would return for a second season, directed by Nikki Spetseris and again produced by Omaha Productions and Words + Pictures. Premiered on May 3, season two had four episodes and featured Notre Dame sophomore Hannah Hidalgo, LSU junior Flau'jae Johnson, and USC graduate student Kiki Iriafen during the 2024–25 NCAA basketball season. The second season earned the series another Sports Emmy nomination in the "Outstanding Sports Documentary Series: Serialized" category.

Players featured in series
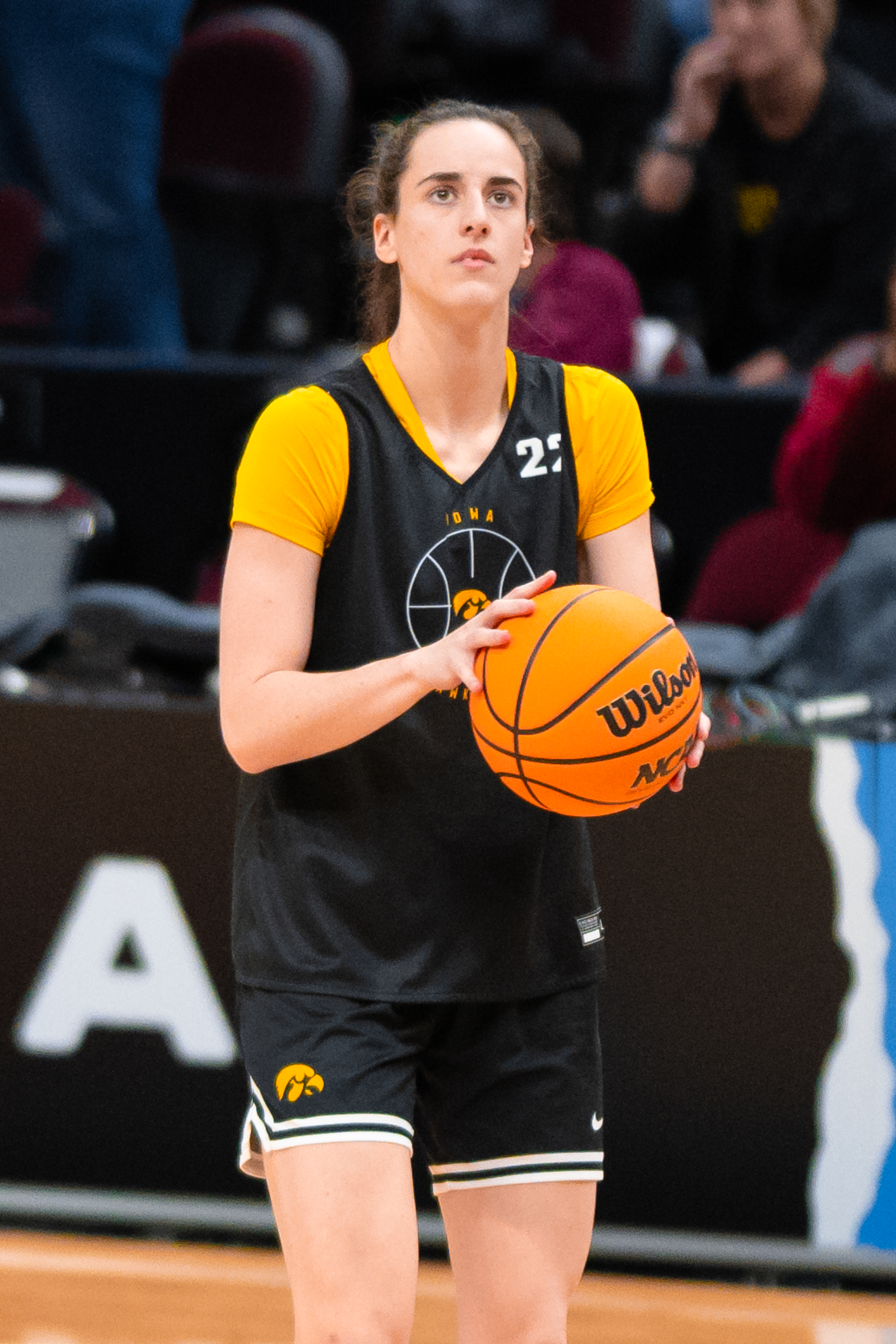

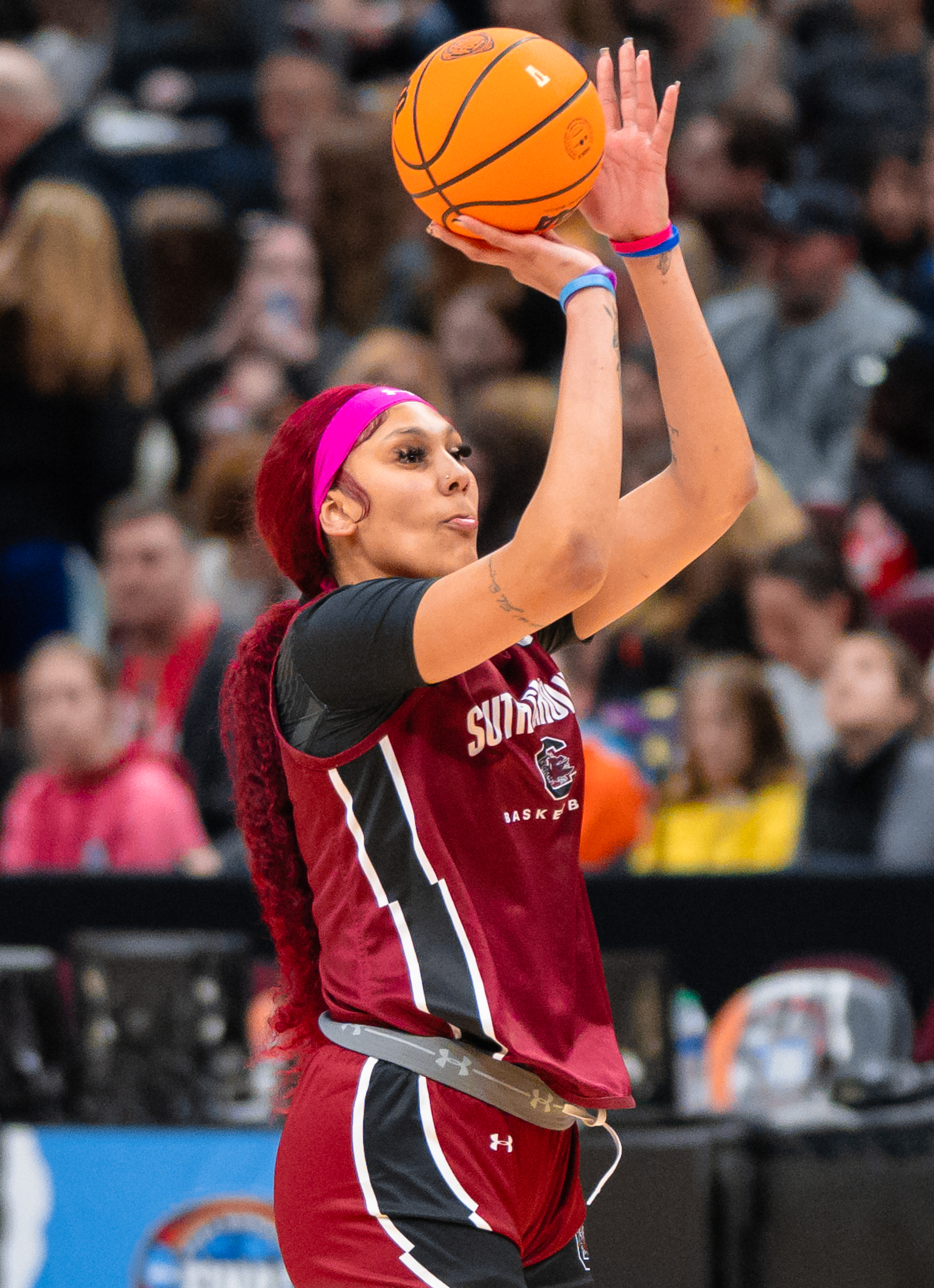

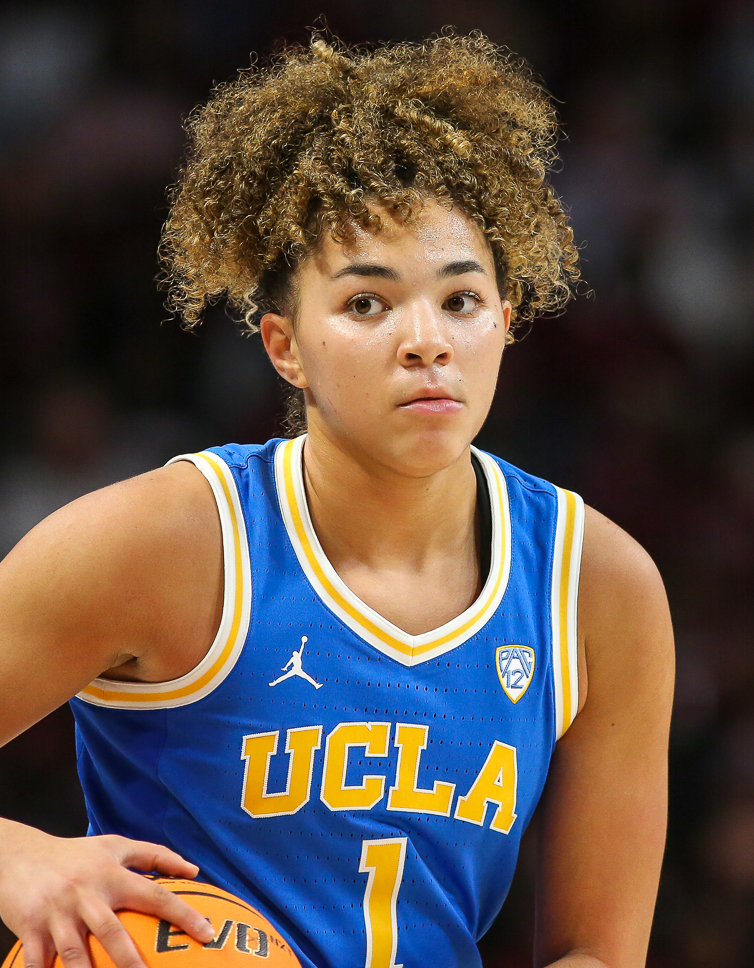

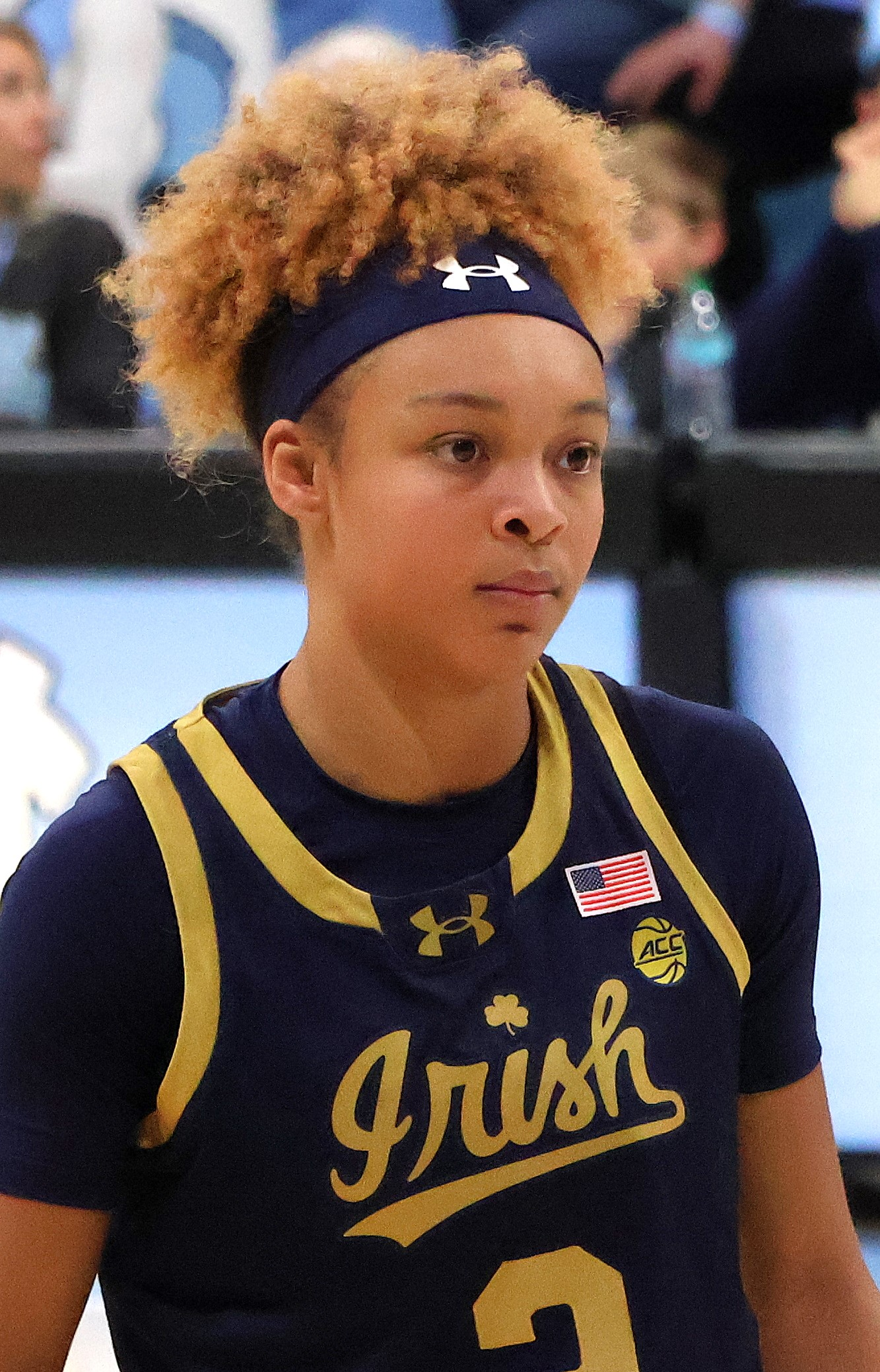

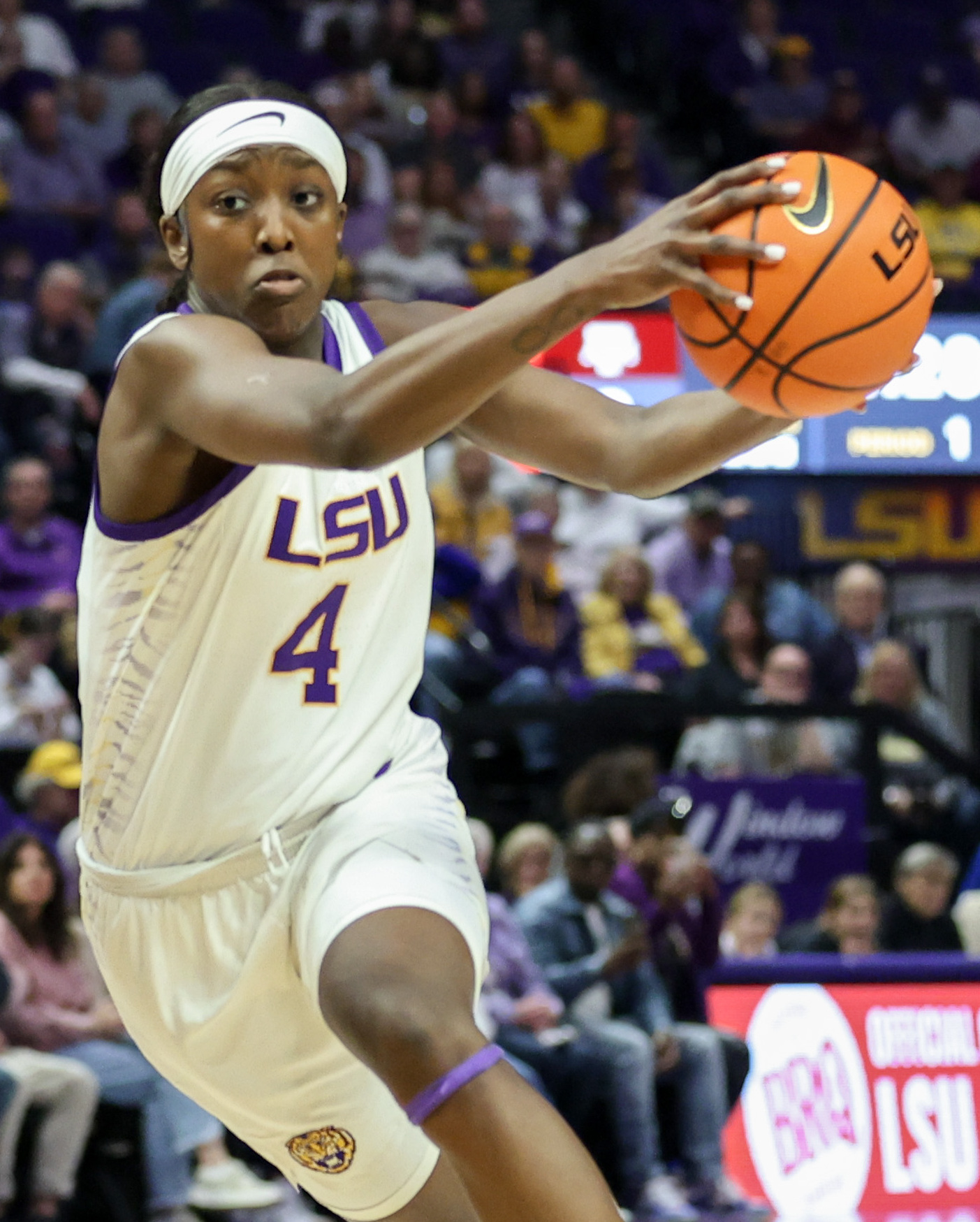
(Left to right): Caitlin Clark, Kamilla Cardoso, Kiki Rice were featured in season 1;
Hannah Hidalgo and Flau'jae Johnson were featured in season 2
