= House v. NCAA =

American class action lawsuit

- Court: United States District Court for the Northern District of California
- Full case name: Grant House and Sedona Prince v. National Collegiate Athletic Association, Pac-12 Conference, The Big Ten Conference, Inc., The Big Twelve Conference, Inc., Southeastern Conference and Atlantic Coast Conference

Court membership
- Judge sitting: Claudia Ann Wilken

Grant House and Sedona Prince v. National Collegiate Athletic Association, et al. is a class action lawsuit brought against the National Collegiate Athletic Association (NCAA) and five collegiate athletic conferences in which the NCAA agreed to allow its member institutions to distribute funds to Division I athletes who have played since 2016. A proposed settlement was approved from the court on June 6, 2025.

== Lawsuit ==
House v. National Collegiate Athletic Association was filed in the United States District Court for the Northern District of California in 2020, against the National Collegiate Athletic Association by Arizona State University swimmer Grant House and Texas Christian University basketball player (University of Oregon in 2020) Sedona Prince. House and Prince sought name, image, and likeness damages and an injunction to force the NCAA and affiliated athletic conferences to lift restrictions on revenue sharing from broadcast rights. The case was assigned to judge Claudia Ann Wilken, who previously decided in favor of the plaintiffs in O'Bannon v. NCAA (2014) and Alston v. NCAA (2020). In November 2023, Wilken granted class-action certification for the damages alleged to have been incurred, expanding the parties affected to any Division I athlete who played after 2016 with a four-year statute of limitations.

== Settlement ==
On May 23, 2024, the National Collegiate Athletic Association voted to settle the lawsuit for US$2.75 billion, agreeing to a revenue-sharing model allowing member institutions to distribute funds up to US$20 million to Division I athletes who have played since 2016. On June 6, 2025, Wilken approved the settlement.

== See also ==
- Student athlete compensation
