= The Turnaround (film) =

2024 American documentary short film

- Directed by: Kyle Thrash; Ben Proudfoot
- Produced by: Josh Rosenberg; Nicholas Ruff; Ben Proudfoot
- Cinematography: David Bolen
- Edited by: Dillon Hayes
- Music by: Ari Balouzian
- Production companies: A Cookie Jar & A Dream Studios; Breakwater Studios; Higher Ground Productions
- Release date: October 18, 2024
- Running time: 25 minutes
- Country: United States
- Language: English

The Turnaround is a 2024 American documentary short film directed by Kyle Thrash and co-directed Ben Proudfoot. It follows Jon McCann, a fan of the American professional baseball team the Philadelphia Phillies who rallied fan support for struggling shortstop Trea Turner in 2023. The film explores mental health, community, and sports fan culture.

== Plot ==
The Turnaround centers on Jon McCann, a Philadelphia native from Bridesburg, who faces mental health challenges. Known as "The Philly Captain," he encourages Phillies fans to support Trea Turner during a tough 2023 season, leading to a standing ovation at Citizens Bank Park that impacts Turner’s performance and the team’s season. The film connects McCann’s upbringing with teenage parents in tough economic conditions to themes of community and resilience, using archival footage to depict Philadelphia’s critical fanbase.

== Cast ==
- Jon McCann as Himself
- Stewie the Dog as Himself
- Trea Turner as Himself (archive footage)
- J.D. Drew as Himself (archive footage)
- Alex Rodriguez as Himself (archive footage)

Luke the Usher (himself)

== Production ==
Directed by Kyle Thrash (The Sentence of Michael Thompson) and co-directed Ben Proudfoot (The Queen of Basketball), the film was inspired by Turner’s viral ovation. It was produced by Proudfoot, Nicholas Ruff, and Josh Rosenberg. Executive producers included Barack Obama and Michelle Obama, through their production company Higher Ground, along with Vinnie Malhotra, Ethan Lewis, Kyle Thrash, Jake Bloch, Rebecca Covington, Mark Rooks, and Nick Trotta. Edited by Dillon M. Hayes, with cinematography by David Bolen and music by Ari Balouzian, it was shot in Philadelphia with archival footage of players like Turner, Drew, and Rodriguez.

== Release ==
The film premiered at Telluride Film Festival on September 1, 2024, as one of three short films in the main program. Acquired by Netflix, it was released on October 18, 2024.

== Reception ==
Variety described it as a project that “tells the story of Philadelphia Phillies’ superfan Jon McCann, who helped inspire an unlikely 2023 standing ovation for Phillies shortstop Trea Turner, which helped turned the team around”. Deadline called it “a remarkable story from the sporting world that suggests Philadelphia, indeed, deserves to be called the City of Brotherly Love”.

== Accolades ==
| Year | Award | Category | Recipient(s) | Result | Ref. |
|---|---|---|---|---|---|
| 2024 | Critics' Choice Documentary Awards | Best Short Documentary | The Turnaround | Nominated | |
| 2024 | Critics' Choice Documentary Awards | Best Sports Documentary | The Turnaround | Nominated | |
| 2024 | Hollywood Music in Media Awards | Original Score – Short Film (Documentary) | Ari Balouzian | Nominated | |
| 2025 | Sports Emmy Awards | Outstanding Short Documentary | Kyle Thrash and Ben Proudfoot | Won | |
| 2025 | Sports Emmy Awards | Outstanding Camera Work - Long Form | David Bolen | Nominated | |
| 2025 | Sports Emmy Awards | Outstanding Music Direction | Ari Balouzian | Nominated | |
