= Student athlete compensation =

Payments for college athletes

Student athlete compensation in the United States refers to the evolving legal, economic, and regulatory landscape governing whether and how college and high‑school athletes may receive payment for their participation in sports or for the commercial use of their name, image, and likeness (NIL).

Historically, the National Collegiate Athletic Association (NCAA) prohibited direct compensation to athletes under the principle of amateurism, limiting benefits to scholarships and modest stipends. This model began to erode as legal challenges, state legislation, and shifting public attitudes questioned the NCAA’s restrictions and highlighted the substantial revenues generated by college sports.

A major turning point came with California's Fair Pay to Play Act (2019), which allowed student‑athletes in the state to profit from NIL rights, prompting similar legislation across the country. In National Collegiate Athletic Association v. Alston (2021), the U.S. Supreme Court unanimously ruled against NCAA limits on education‑related benefits, with concurring opinions sharply criticizing the amateurism model and emphasizing the commercial nature of college athletics. Following the decision, the NCAA adopted an interim NIL policy permitting athletes nationwide to engage in endorsement deals, sponsorships, and other forms of compensation.

The NIL era has since expanded rapidly, with collectives, private companies, and universities playing major roles in facilitating athlete deals. High‑school athletes in several states have also become eligible for NIL agreements, and Congress has introduced multiple bills seeking national standards. Ongoing debates center on taxation, Title IX implications, competitive balance, and whether NIL compensation blurs the line between collegiate and professional sports. Recent legal settlements, including the House v. NCAA agreement allowing revenue sharing with athletes, signal a continuing shift toward recognizing student‑athletes as economic participants in a multibillion‑dollar industry. NIL has also expanded exponentially with the promises of students being paid life-changing money with school-wide benefit caps of $21.6M per year (2026-27), through revenue sharing and continues to change the landscape of university athletics with also adding more brand deals and video games.

== History ==
The NCAA had long maintained that student-athletes cannot be compensated in the name of "amateurism". In 1953, the NCAA created the term "student-athlete" in response to the Colorado Supreme Court's ruling in University of Denver v. Nemeth that an injured football player was an "employee" of the University of Denver and therefore entitled to workers' compensation. Despite further attempts by the NCAA to classify student-athlete compensation as a violation of the Commerce and Contracts Clauses of the U.S. Constitution, "amateurism" in college sports had begun to fade as the push for student-athlete compensation grew stronger.

The latest movement in the college athlete compensation space focuses on payment for name, image, and likeness (NIL), a practice first adopted by the state of California in 2019. In September 2019, Governor Gavin Newsom signed Senate Bill 206, which generally allowed student-athletes in California to accept compensation for the use of their name, image, and likeness. The "Fair Pay to Play Act" bill was authored by California state senators Nancy Skinner and Steven Bradford and advanced with testimony from former Stanford volleyball star and 2015 national freshman of the year Hayley Hodson and Oklahoma State University football star Russell Okung. No federal statutes used to touch on this topic, and the only federal regulation permitting college students to accept compensation was 34 CFR § 675.16, which related to work-study programs.

The Supreme Court's 2021 decision in NCAA v. Alston shed light on modern federal attitudes towards student-athlete compensation. In this case, the Court struck down any potential limitations on education-related benefits that student-athletes may receive. In particular, the Court – and especially Justice Brett Kavanaugh – rejected the NCAA's "amateurism" argument as an overly broad and outdated defense for failing to allow its revenue-drivers (i.e., student-athletes) to receive compensation. The NCAA contended that the Court should defer to its amateurism model because it is a joint venture along with its member schools, but the Court instead reasoned that deference was inappropriate since the NCAA has a monopoly in the relevant market. The Court further rejected the NCAA's appeal that it was not a "commercial enterprise," noting the "highly profitable" and "professional" nature of certain college sports.

Several startups, including ATHLYT, have emerged to connect brands with student-athletes following the NCAA’s adoption of interim NIL policies, signaling a growing marketplace for athlete sponsorships. Grambling University signed what is believed to be one of the first NIL deals in 2022. In July 2023, multiple bills were introduced by members of Congress to regulate NIL.

In May 2024, NCAA settled the House v. NCAA class action lawsuit for $2.8 billion. The main plaintiffs, Grant House and Sedona Prince, sought an injunction to force the NCAA and affiliated athletic conferences to lift restrictions on revenue sharing from broadcast rights. The plaintiffs also sought damages related to their inability to use their name, image, and likeness. This lawsuit highlights changes in the legal approach to the NCAA's amateurism defense, which had been central to its stance on student-athlete compensation but was nearly eliminated by the NCAA v. Alston decision. As part of the settlement, schools are allowed to share up to $20.5 million of revenue a year with athletes, but NIL deals must go through a clearinghouse to determine if they are "fair market value".

Beyond judicial settlements, federal lawmakers have increasingly sought to establish uniform national standards to replace state-by-state regulatory patchworks. In September 2026, the U.S. Senate passed the bipartisan Protect College Sports Act to create nationwide regulations for athlete compensation.Legal analysts at Ropes & Gray note that under proposed federal guidelines, Division 1 athletes must report third-party NIL agreements exceeding $600 to institutional clearinghouses, while "multimedia rights holders and sponsors must certify that institutional funds are not the origination source" of third-party payments, maintaining strict boundaries between direct revenue sharing and third-party endorsements.

In March 2025, Amir "Aura" Khan, a student manager on McNeese's men's basketball team, garnered widespread attention for being the first student manager of an NCAA varsity team to sign a NIL endorsement by signing NIL marketing deals with TickPick, Insomnia Cookies, and Buffalo Wild Wings.

== Claimed advantages ==
Name, Image, and Likeness (NIL) policies permit student-athletes to receive compensation while maintaining scholarship eligibility. Prior to these policies, compensation was limited to educational expenses, which some critics argued did not reflect the economic value of athletes. NIL policies also enable student-athletes to engage in endorsement and branding activities. NIL income has been associated with financial considerations for athletes from low-income backgrounds and with changes in recruitment and retention decisions. NIL has also contributed to the growth of athlete endorsement opportunities across multiple sports. Recent analyses report that the NIL marketplace has expanded into a multibillion-dollar industry. The implementation of NIL policies continues to evolve as schools and governing bodies adjust regulations.

The NCAA adopted Name, Image, and Likeness (NIL) policies for student-athletes across all three divisions on June 30, 2021. This regulation enables athletes to monetize their personal brand and professional talents. The policy allows athletes to generate personal income, providing financial opportunities for themselves and their families while offering experience in financial management.

== Criticism ==
One large area of concern from recent NIL bills are the tax implications for student athletes. The NCAA maintains tax-exempt status by claiming its purpose in "fostering amateur athletics." NCAA universities are typically exempt from federal income tax because they are classified as charitable organizations. If the NCAA were to frequently enter contracts with student athletes and compensate them it could be at risk to losing this status. One impact on student athletes would be that their athletic scholarships would be subject to income tax. Additionally, student athletes would have to navigate varying state taxes. Some critics argue that because of these complications, student athlete compensation wouldn't be beneficial overall.

Another protest about student athlete compensation is that the NIL landscape will take away from the amateurism in the NCAA and commercialize college sports. Top NIL earners such as Livvy Dunne, an LSU gymnast with over one million followers on Instagram and TikTok, made several million dollars a year. There are worries that this type of income will blur the line between college and professional sports and remove the unique appeal and camaraderie of college sports. This has caused concerns about the implications on college recruiting due to the lack of national standardization for NIL legislation. Shortly after the Court's decision in Alston, the NCAA issued an interim name, image, and likeness policy which permits student-athletes to earn this compensation. States have also followed suit by enacting similar laws. To date, 29 states have some sort of NIL legislation in place since the Alston interim policy was put into place. For example, Illinois Public Law 102-0042 permits athletes to receive market-value compensation for the use of their name, image, and likeness. Critics have also argued that the combination of the transfer portal and Name, Image, and Likeness (NIL) opportunities has contributed to the increased amount of instability within college programs. The transfer portal has been described as creating a sort of “revolving door” effect, and this has led to rosters becoming unstable at times. This also results in reduced player loyalty and uncertainty for both athletes and coaches. Frequent player movement can make it more difficult for teams to establish and maintain a real consistent culture, as a high roster turnover can disrupt the communication of shared values between teammates and coaches and long-term team development. Some researchers and coaches argue that while the system may support short-term success for the players, it can undermine long-term program stability and cohesion.

Some researchers have also raised concerns about the impact of NIL opportunities and the transfer portal on these student-athletes’ and their mental health. This is caused from increased pressure to secure financial opportunities, maintain up to par performance, and make transfer decisions has been linked to higher levels of stress and uncertainty among athletes.

Beyond mental health concerns, the expansion of NIL is transforming student-athletes' identities and everyday commitments. Empirical research from the University of Florida indicates that athletes are increasingly acting as digital marketers and content creators. Sport management professor Molly Harry notes that under this system "athletes are starting to develop roles and identities related to that of a influencer" alongside their academic work. Navigating these commercial ventures requires significant entrepreneurship, leading some athletes to adjust their traditional training routines to manage brand deals and build post-collegiate business careers.

== Revenue-sharing ==
A mechanism separate from NIL that is developing for compensating student-athletes is revenue sharing. This is when income is distributed directly from a university’s athletic department budget to an athlete. Unlike NIL arrangements, which typically involve a third-party agreement such as endorsements or media campaigns, revenue sharing is administered by the institution itself. Both NIL and revenue-sharing provide student-athletes with financial benefits, However they differ in structure. NIL opportunities allow athletes greater autonomy to build personal brands and generate income independently, while revenue sharing provides more direct and potentially stable compensation derived from institutional earnings.

Compensation through revenue sharing may vary by sport. Football and basketball are often associated with larger distributions due to the large income the program receives each year. The introduction of revenue sharing can also influence recruiting and team dynamics. Athletes in prominent roles may have increased earning potential and decision-making considerations. By offering compensation beyond scholarships and NIL opportunities, revenue sharing represents a significant shift in collegiate athletics, enabling institutions to allocate a portion of their revenue directly to student-athletes for the first time. Following the House V. NCAA settlement, institutions implementing revenue sharing operate under an initial cap permitting athletic departments to distribute up to $20.5 million annually to student-athletes for the 25-26 academic year. The projected revenue-sharing limit for colleges during the 2026–27 season is roughly $21.58 million per institution.

Additionally, traditional sport-by-sport scholarship caps were replaced with roster limits, Legal analysts at BakerHostetler note that under the settlement, "all non institutional, third-party name, image and likeness (NIL) agreements valued at $600 or more must be reported and independently review for compliance" to establish fair market value.

== High school athletes ==
Athletes still in high school began signing NIL deals in May 2022, beginning with Nike signing Harvard-Westlake School soccer players Alyssa Thompson and Gisele Thompson, followed by NIL deals signed by basketball prospects Bronny James, Dajuan Wagner Jr., and JuJu Watkins in October 2022. Some high-school athletics associations subsequently adjusted their rules to allow high-school athletes to sign NIL deals while retaining their athletic eligibility. For example, the Oregon School Activities Association approved student NIL deals on October 10, 2022, leading to a local apparel company signing two Oregon Ducks basketball commits on October 21 in the state's first high-school NIL deals. Other states allowed high-school NIL deals with restrictions, such as Missouri, which enacted a state law in July 2023 allowing high-school NIL deals only if athletes commit to a Missouri-based college.

Life Center Academy basketball prospect Kiyomi McMiller signed Nike label Jordan Brand's first high-school NIL deal in February 2023, and in July 2023 Lake Oswego High School senior Mia Brahe-Pedersen signed Nike's first high-school track-and-field NIL deal. In January 2025, Adidas signed Ethan Holliday, the company's first such deal with a baseball player.

== International Student-Athletes ==
Despite athletes gaining widespread NIL opportunities, international student-athletes face heavy legal restrictions due to federal visa regulations. Under standard F-1 visa terms, off-campus employment is strictly limited, creating a notable compensation gap. Education researcher Aleandra Rakeem Pinder notes that foreign athletes perform indentical athletic duties but "If an international student-athlete performed the same duties and received direct payments, they would be in violation and subject to deportation" under immigration law. Consequently, foreign student-athletes are forced to navigate complex legal uncertainties, often relying on alternative options such as Curricular Practical Training (CPT) exemptions, international-only endorsement deals while outside U.S. borders, or passive royalty arrangements to earn compensation without risking their legal status.

== Collectives ==
The Internal Revenue Service defines collectives as organizations which are "structurally independent of a school, yet fund NIL opportunities for the school’s student-athletes". They can be tax-exempt or for profit entities which can either package business opportunities in a marketplace, or pool booster and supporter funds and deliver them to athletes. Most Division I universities now have collectives which can provide funds for selected athletes or a full team; however, there has been criticism that the use of collectives may circumvent Title IX, which require equal opportunities between men and women in college sports.

=== Major collectives ===
The following is a partial list of some major NIL collectives and their affiliated university athletic program.

- Alliance 412 (University of Pittsburgh)
- Arkansas Edge (University of Arkansas)
- Canes Connection (University of Miami)
- Champions Circle (University of Michigan)
- Classic City Collective (University of Georgia)
- Cougar Collective (Washington State University)
- Crimson Collective (University of Utah)
- Dinkytown Athletics (University of Minnesota)
- Division Street (University of Oregon)
- Every True Tiger (University of Missouri)
- Fear the Wave Collective (Tulane University)
- 502 Circle (University of Louisville)
- Friends of the University of Notre Dame (FUND)
- Garnet Trust (University of South Carolina)
- ICON Collective (University of Illinois)
- Lonestar NIL (All Texas schools)
- Matador Club (Texas Tech University)
- MESA Foundation (San Diego State University)
- On to Victory (Auburn University)
- 1870 Society (for-profit) (Ohio State University)
- 1890 Nebraska (University of Nebraska)
- Paradise Collective (Florida Atlantic University)
- Rising Spear (Florida State University)
- SD4L (Michigan State University)
- Spyre Sports Group (for profit) (University of Tennessee)
- Texas Aggies United (Texas A&M University)
- Texas One Fund (University of Texas at Austin)
- The Battle's End (Florida State University)
- The Foundation (non-profit) (Ohio State University)
- The Grove Collective (University of Mississippi)
- The Volunteer Club (University of Tennessee)
- We Will Club and Collective (Iowa State University)
- Yea Alabama (University of Alabama)
- The Royal Blue Collective (Brigham Young University)

== See also ==
- Personality rights
