= 46th Sports Emmy Awards =

- Date: May 20, 2025
- Location: Jazz at Lincoln Center's Frederick P. Rose Hall, New York City
- Hosted by: Roy Wood Jr.
- Most awards: Games of the XXXIII Olympiad (10)
- Most nominations: Games of the XXXIII Olympiad (27)

The 46th Sports Emmy Awards were presented by the National Academy of Television Arts and Sciences (NATAS), honoring the best in American sports television coverage in 2024. The ceremony took place in-person at the Jazz at Lincoln Center's Frederick P. Rose Hall in New York City on Tuesday, May 20, 2025. Comedian, writer, and producer Roy Wood Jr. hosted the ceremony.

The nominations were announced on April 8, 2025. ESPN received the most nominations with 63, while the Games of the XXXIII Olympiad was the most nominated program, with 27 nominations. Australian-born American executive producer and inaugural Fox Sports president David Hill was honored with the Sports Lifetime Achievement Award.

The coverage for the Games of the XXXIII Olympiad was the most awarded program with 10 wins. ESPN and NBC tied with the most awards with 13 wins each.

== Winners and nominees ==
The nominees were announced on April 8, 2025. Winners were announced on May 20, 2025, and are listed in bold.

=== Lifetime Achievement Award ===
- David Hill

=== Programming ===
| Outstanding Live Sports Special - Championship Event | Outstanding Live Sports Special - Non-Championship Event |
|---|---|
| **Games of the XXXIII Olympiad (NBC / Peacock)**; The 120th World Series: "New York Yankees vs Los Angeles Dodgers" (FOX); The 124th US Open (NBC / USA Network / Peacock); The Masters (CBS); NCAA Women's Tournament Championship Game (ABC) | **Rickwood Field: A Tribute to the Negro Leagues: "St. Louis Cardinals vs San Francisco Giants" (FOX)**; The 108th Indianapolis 500 (NBC / Peacock); The 125th Army-Navy Game (CBS); The 66th Daytona 500 (FOX); NFL Wild Card Game Live from Bikini Bottom: "Houston Texans vs Los Angeles Chargers" (Nickelodeon) |
| Outstanding Live Series | Outstanding Playoff Coverage |
| **SEC on ABC** **(ABC / ESPN+)**; College Football on CBS (CBS); Monday Night Football (ESPN / ABC / ESPN+); NFL on FOX (FOX); NFL on CBS (CBS); Sunday Night Football (NBC / Peacock) | **NFL Playoffs on NBC** **(NBC / Peacock)**; College Football Playoff (ESPN / TNT); National League Playoffs (FOX / FS1); NBA on TNT (TNT); NCAA Men's Basketball Tournament (CBS / TNT) |
| Outstanding Edited Event Coverage | Outstanding Edited Special |
| **NFL Draft: The Pick Is In (The Roku Channel)**; Hey Rookie: Welcome To The NFL (ESPN); NFL Game Day All-Access: "Super Bowl LIX" (NFL YouTube); NFL Turning Point (ESPN+); Scottie 24 (PGA Tour YouTube) | **SportsCenter: "SC Special: The Harbaugh Brothers" (ESPN)**; The 2019 Masters: A Sunday Unlike Any Other (CBS); E:60: "No Easy Victories: The 1994 New York Rangers" (ESPN / ESPN+); Lap of Legends (AMC / Roku / BBC America); UFC Year of the Fighter: "Georges St-Pierre" (UFC Fight Pass) |
| Outstanding Hosted Edited Series | Outstanding Esports Championship Coverage |
| **E:60 (ESPN)**; Club Shay Shay (Shay Shay Media / The Volume); NFL Films (FS1); Olympic Highlights with Hart & Kenan Thompson (NBC / Peacock); The Shop (YouTube) | **VALORANT Champions 2024 Grand Final: "Edward Gaming vs Team Heretics" (Valorant Esports)**; 2024 Call of Duty League Championship Weekend: "OpTic Texas vs New York Subliners" (Call of Duty League); DOTA 2 Championships: "The International 2024" (DOTA 2); Intel Extreme Masters Cologne 2024: "Team Vitality vs NaVi" (ESL Counter-Strike); League of Legends Worlds 2024 Final: "T1 vs BiliBili Gaming" (LoL Esports) |
| Outstanding Short Documentary | Outstanding Long Documentary |
| **The Turnaround (Netflix)**; 9066: Fear, Football, and the Theft of Freedom (NFL Network); Comeback: A March Madness Story (truTV); Games of the XXXIII Olympiad: "In the Company of Heroes" (NBC / Peacock); Through The Storm (NFL Network) | **Mountain Queen: The Summits of Lhakpa Sherpa (Netflix)**; ChiefsAholic: A Wolf in Chief's Clothing (Prime Video); Giannis: The Marvelous Journey (Prime Video); Las Amazonas de Yaxunah (ESPN Deportes); The Lionheart (HBO / Max) |
| Outstanding Documentary Series | Outstanding Documentary Series - Serialized |
| **The Comeback: 2004 Boston Red Sox (Netflix)**; Charlie Hustle & The Matter of Pete Rose (HBO / Max); Game 7 (Prime Video); In the Arena: Serena Williams (ESPN+); Untold (Netflix) | **Formula 1: Drive to Survive** **(Netflix)**; Full Court Press (ABC / ESPN+); Hard Knocks: "Offseason with the New York Giants" (HBO / Max); Messi's World Cup: The Rise of a Legend (Apple TV+); The Money Game: LSU (Prime Video) |
| Outstanding Studio Show - Weekly | Outstanding Studio Show - Daily |
| **College GameDay (ESPN)**; MLB on Fox (FOX / FS1); Fox NFL Sunday (FOX); Inside the NBA (TNT); Thursday Night Football (Prime Video) | **NFL Live** **(ESPN / ESPN2)**; The Dan Patrick Show (Peacock); Good Morning Football (NFL Network); MLB Central (MLB Network); MLB Tonight (MLB Network); Pardon the Interruption (ESPN) |
| Outstanding Studio Show - Limited Run | Outstanding Journalism |
| **FOX MLB: The Postseason** **(FOX / FS1)**; College GameDay: "College Football Playoff" (ESPN); Inside the NBA: "Playoffs" (TNT); NHL on TNT: "Stanley Cup Playoffs" (TNT); Road to the Final Four (CBS / TNT) | **The New York Times Presents: Broken Horses (FX / Hulu)**; E:60: "Pat Tillman: Life. Death. Legacy." (ESPN); E:60: "Second Wind: The Boomer and Gunnar Esiason Story" (ESPN); Richard Engel Reports: "Fighting for Olympic Gold: Ukraine's Athletes at War" (NBC); Uninterrupted's Real Stories of Basketball: "Scam Dunk" (VICE TV) |
| Outstanding Short Feature | Outstanding Long Feature |
| **Games of the XXXIII Olympiad: "Caeleb & The Critic" (NBC / Peacock)**; The 120th World Series: "Father and Sons - The Freddie Freeman Story" (FOX); College GameDay: "Uncle Joe" (ESPN); Golf Central Live from the PGA Championship: "For Trazzy" (Golf Channel); Thursday Night Football: "What If" (Prime Video) | **SportsCenter: "SC Featured: The 6-Year Plan" (ESPN)**; MLB Tonight: "A Bond Beyond Baseball" (MLB Network); NFL 360: "#FREETEZ" (NFL Network); SportsCenter: "SC Featured: Pete's Legacy" (ESPN); Tennis Channel Live: "Tennis can be my medicine." (Tennis Channel) |
| Outstanding Open/Tease | Outstanding Interactive Experience |
| **Games of the XXXIII Olympiad****: "Land of Stories" (NBC / Peacock)**; The 124th US Open: "Fatherhood" (NBC / Peacock); Games of the XXXIII Olympiad: "Beyoncé: Meet Team USA" (NBC / Peacock); NHL on ESPN: "Gloves - The Story of Phil Pritchard and the Stanley Cup" (ESPN); UEFA Champions League: "A New Era" (CBS / UEFA) | **Games of the XXXIII Olympiad (NBC / Peacock)**; 2024 LIV Golf League: "Any Shot Any Time" (LIV GOLF X); Invisible Disabilities (ESPN.com); Pat Tillman - The Battle Within (ESPN.com); Thursday Night Football: "Black Friday Football" (Prime Video) |
| Outstanding Digital Innovation | Outstanding Promotional Announcement |
| **COSM (FOX)**; Lap of Legends (AMC / Roku / BBC America); NFL on NBC: "Madden NFL Cast" (NBC / Peacock); NHL on ESPN: "NHL in ASL" (ESPN+); Noche UFC: "Immersive 360 Experience" (ESPN+); Thursday Night Football: "TNF Prime Vision: Sky Cam Overlays" (Prime Video) | **Usyk Vs Fury Reignited: "TNT" (DAZN)**; 2024 Emirates NBA Cup: "The Heist II" (NBA Social); 2024 NBA Finals: "The Toast" (NBA Social); 2024 NBA on Christmas Day: "Jingle Hoops: Regifted" (NBA Social); Full Court Press: "Inner Baller" (ESPN) |
| Outstanding Public Service Content | Outstanding Studio Show in Spanish |
| **NFC Championship Game: "Somebody" (FOX)**; Letter to My Father: "Zeke Thomas" (CBS); Notre Dame Football: "What Would You Fight For?" (NBC); Super Bowl LIX: "Flag 50" (FOX); Youth Flag Football: "Let's Play" (NFL Network) | **Fútbol Central** **(Univision / TUDN)**; Fuera de Juego (ESPN+); Juegos Olímpicos Paris 2024 (Telemundo / Universo / Peacock); Sunday Night Football (Telemundo / Universo / Peacock); Zona Mixta (Telemundo) |
Outstanding Feature Story in Spanish
**Greenland: "San Francisco" (ESPN Deportes / ESPN+)**; Juegos Olímpicos Paris 2024: "El Niño" (Telemundo / Universo / Peacock); Juegos Olímpicos Paris 2024: "Hermanos Limardo: Lazos de Acero" (Telemundo / Universo / Peacock); Juegos Olímpicos Paris 2024: "Momentos Que Marcan" (Telemundo / Universo / Peacock); Mundo NFL Originals: "Bayron Matos: Orgullo de Los Mina" (Mundo NFL / NFL Social); SportsCenter: "SC Reportajes: MI NOMBRE ES DANY GARCIA" (ESPN Deportes / ESPN+)

=== Personality ===
| Outstanding Personality/Studio Host | Outstanding Personality/Play-by-Play |
|---|---|
| **Ernie Johnson (TNT / tbs)**; Scott Hanson (NFL Network / Peacock); Kate Scott (CBS / CBS Sports Network / Paramount+ / CBS Golazo Network); Mike Tirico (NBC / Peacock); Scott Van Pelt (ESPN / ABC / ESPN2) | **Joe Davis (FOX / FS1)**; Mike Breen (ABC); Ian Eagle (CBS / TNT / Netflix); Noah Eagle (NBC / Peacock / Netflix); Mike Tirico (NBC / Peacock) |
| Outstanding Personality/Studio Analyst | Outstanding Personality/Event Analyst |
| **Charles Barkley (TNT** **/ tbs)**; Nate Burleson (CBS); Ryan Clark (ESPN / ABC / ESPN2 / ESPN+); Kirk Herbstreit (ESPN / Prime Video); Dan Orlovsky (ESPN / ABC / ESPN2) | **Peyton Manning** **(ESPN2)**; Troy Aikman (ESPN / ABC); Greg Olsen (FOX); Bill Raftery (CBS / TNT / FOX); John Smoltz (FOX / FS1) |
| Outstanding Personality/Sideline Reporter | Outstanding Personality/Emerging On-Air Talent |
| **Tracy Wolfson (CBS / TNT)**; Jenny Dell (CBS); Kaylee Hartung (Prime Video / NBC / Peacock); Tom Rinaldi (FOX / FS1); Holly Rowe (ESPN / ABC / ESPN+); Lisa Salters (ESPN / ABC) | **Nick Saban** **(ESPN)**; Ryan Fitzpatrick (Prime Video); Jason Kelce (ESPN / ABC / ESPN2); Richard Sherman (Prime Video); Jay Wright (CBS / TNT) |
Outstanding On-Air Personality in Spanish
**Miguel Gurwitz (Telemundo** **/ Universo / Peacock)**; Andrés Cantor (Telemundo); Rolando Cantú (Telemundo / Universo / Peacock); Mauricio Pedroza (ESPN Deportes / ESPN+); Pilar Pérez (ESPN2 / ESPN+)

=== Technical ===
| Outstanding Technical Team Event | Outstanding Technical Team Studio |
|---|---|
| **Games of the XXXIII Olympiad – Technical Team (NBC / Peacock)**; 2024 US Open (ESPN / ABC / ESPN2 / ESPN+); The Masters – Technical Team (CBS); Noche UFC: "UFC 306 at Noche UFC" – Technical Team (ESPN / ESPN2 / ESPN+ / UFC Fight Pass); Super Bowl LIX – Technical Team (FOX) | **Games of the XXXIII Olympiad – Technical Team (NBC / Peacock)**; FOX NFL Sunday – Technical Team (FOX); FOX Summer of Soccer: "The Soccer Palace" – Technical Team (FOX / FS1 / FS2); NFL Draft – Technical Team (ESPN / ABC); Thursday Night Football – Technical Team (Prime Video) |
| Outstanding Camera Work - Short Form | Outstanding Camera Work - Long Form |
| **NFL Films Presents****: "Shots of the Year"** **– Hannah Epstein, Phil Gushue, Ben Johnson, Dave Malek, DJ McConduit, Howard Neef Jr., Jeremy Nieves, Kevin Simkins, Nick Straus (FS1)**; The 150th Kentucky Derby – Tomas Garza, Eric Girgash, Harris Mendheim, Taylor Morrison, William D. Moss III (NBC / Peacock); Games of the XXXIII Olympiad: "Caeleb & The Critic" – Aaron Mendez, John Biggins, Samson Chan, Eric Girgash, Theodore Caleb Haas (NBC / Peacock); NFL Divisional Round on ESPN: "In the Air Tonight" – Bryan Brousseau, David Sorafine, Jeffrey Alred, Ryan Elliot, Joel Fletcher, Donny Melara, TJ Millard, Angel Pagourtzis, Mike Pustere, Bryan Sprow, Chris Swoboda, Thor Wixom, Logan Cascia (ESPN / ABC); NFL Films Presents: "The Silent Super Bowl" – Hannah Epstein, Phil Gushue, Ben Johnson, Dave Malek, DJ McConduit, Howard Neef Jr., Jeremy Nieves, Kevin Simkins, Nick Straus (FS1); UEFA Champions League: "A New Era" – Jon Roche, Manuel Bove, Julien Dehersemaeker, Luca Pastore, Orlando Salmeri, Oliver Anderson, Anthony Cortese (CBS / UEFA) | **Anytime – Colin Jones, Darren McCullough, Darcy Wittenburg, Anna Dziczkaniece, Ansel Luchau, Kelsey Toevs, Brian Wulf, Matt Butterworth, Jonathan Osborne (Red Bull TV)**; Giannis: The Marvelous Journey – Mike Bollacke, Thom McCallum (Prime Video); The Lionheart – Cesar Alvarez, Baxter Bailey, Vaughn Potter, David Bolen, Cole Ellett, Michael Faller, Brandon Somerhalder, Adam Stone (HBO / Max); Mountain Queen: The Summits of Lhakpa Sherpa – Devin Whetstone, Matthew Irving, Dawa Sherpa, Dawa Geljen Sherpa, Karma Gyaljie Sherpa, Pasang Sherpa (Netflix); The Turnaround – David Bolen (Netflix) |
| Outstanding Editing - Short Form | Outstanding Editing - Long Form |
| **Games of the XXXIII Olympiad: "Land of Stories" – Ryan Yeager (NBC / Peacock)**; NASCAR on FOX: "Walk with the Greats: The Heroes of Daytona" – Jon Housholder, Jeff Schafer (NASCAR on FOX YouTube); NHL on ESPN: "Gloves - The Story of Phil Pritchard and the Stanley Cup" – Mike Farrell (ESPN); Sunday Night Football – William D. Moss III, Ryan Yeager (NBC / Peacock); Thursday Night Football: "Black Friday Open: The Goat" – Ryan Hensley, Keith Tonini (Prime Video); Thursday Night Football: "What If" – Ryan Hensley, Rodney McMahon, Maximillian Shelton (Prime Video) | **Rhythm Masters: A Mickey Hart Experience – Dave Lynch (ESPN / ESPN+)**; FLY – Andrey Alistratov, Jay Arthur Sterrenberg, James Martin Morrison (National Geographic); Giannis: The Marvelous Journey – Matt McCormick (Prime Video); The Lionheart – Will Butler, Jonathan Sutak (HBO / Max); NFL 360: "#FREETEZ" – John Orfanopoulos (NFL Network) |
| The Dick Schaap Writing Award - Short Form | Outstanding Writing - Long Form |
| **Games of the XXXIII Olympiad: "Land of Stories" – Aaron Cohen, Jack Felling, Joe Gesue, Steven Spielberg (NBC / Peacock)**; The 124th US Open: "Fatherhood" – Aaron Cohen, Jarrod Ficklin, Aaron Stewart (NBC / Peacock); Games of the XXXIII Olympiad: "Closing Essay" – Mike Tirico (NBC / Peacock); NBA Playoffs on TNT: " Up is Where Dreaming Begins" – Hanif Abdurraqib, Deaton Bell (TNT); The NFL Today: "Kyle Brandt Series" – Kyle Brandt, Dan Ennis (CBS); Sunday Night Football – Aaron Cohen, Justin Masse, Elinore Wright (NBC / Peacock) | **Hard Knocks****: "In Season with the AFC North" – Gerry Reimel (HBO / Max)**; Evolution of the Black Quarterback – Phil Guidry, Fred Anthony Smith, Michael Vick (Prime Video); Games of the XXXIII Olympiad: "In the Company of Heroes" – Joe Gesue, David Picker, Ron Vaccaro (NBC / Peacock); Giannis: The Marvelous Journey – Kristen Lappas (Prime Video) |
| Outstanding Music Direction | Outstanding Audio/Sound - Live Event |
| **Super Bowl LIX: "Hold My Hand" – Seth Dudowsky, Lady Gaga, Bill Richards, Joel Santos, Jesse Weiss, Brad Zager, Joe Nargi (FOX)**; Evolution of the Black Quarterback – Fred Anthony Smith, Brian J. Miller, Timothy Preston (Prime Video); The Lionheart – Jessica Berndt, Chris Swanson, Ali Helnwein (HBO / Max); Noche UFC: "For Mexico, For All Time" – Germaine Franco, James Carroll, Ian LeCheminant, Michael Abbott, Pete Addams, Michael Arnold, Will Chen, Michael Sak (ESPN+); The Turnaround – Arj Balouzian (Netflix) | **Games of the XXXIII Olympiad** **– Audio Engineering Team (NBC / Peacock)**; MLB on FOX – Audio Engineering Team (FOX / FS1); NHL on ESPN – Andy Bartley, Daniel Bernstein, Tim Bischof, Jeffrey Linn, Mark Skipper, Brian Vigouroux, Eric Williams, Abi Sehgal (ESPN / ABC / ESPN2 / ESPN+); NHL Winter Classic on TNT – Craig Barry, Chris Brown, Javi Cabo, Lee Estroff, Dan Gerhard, Eric Grossman, Jordan Keen, Brinton Miller, Dan Nabors, Randy Peckich, Brandon Baginski, Nolan Betterman, David Cabeza, William Cook, Erin Crain, Chris Eckert, Will Finan, Doug Klyn, Paul Lundin (TNT); Sunday Night Football – Wendel Stevens, Raymond Clark, Shane Denham, Mike Feldson, Ed Gaines, Dan Haggard, Eric Pfeiffer, Adam Rodenberg, Clark Stewart, Andrea Sumner (NBC / Peacock) |
| Outstanding Audio/Sound - Post-Produced | Outstanding Graphic Design - Event/Show |
| **In the Arena: Serena Williams – Cameron Tacey, Josh Banach, Tyler Proctor (ESPN / ESPN+)**; FOX NFL Sunday: "The QB Whisperer: You Bloom Where You're Planted" – Fulton Dingley, Jim Mitchell, Mark Lyons, Joe Nargi (FOX); If You Had The Keys To A Formula 1 Car For A Day... – Alexander Haslinger, Bastian Kemmerich, Moriz Oepen, Andreas Posch (Red Bull TV); The Lionheart – Brent Kiser, Jedy Shiheng, Elliot Thompson, Jack DeCraene, Julie Diaz, Pete Osterlund, Kailand Reilly, James Singleton, Jacob Flack (HBO / Max); Rhythm Masters: A Mickey Hart Experience – Jerome Forney, Tom Lattanand, Gary Rivera, Tim Spero (ESPN / ESPN+) | **Games of the XXXIII Olympiad – Graphic Design Team (NBC / Telemundo / Universo / Peacock / NBCOlympics.com)**; College Football Playoff – Graphic Design Team (ESPN); FOX Summer of Soccer: "The Soccer Palace" – Graphic Design Team (FOX / FS1); Noche UFC: "UFC 306 at Noche UFC" – Graphic Design Team (ESPN / ESPN2 / ESPN+ / UFC Fight Pass); Thursday Night Football – Graphic Design Team (Prime Video) |
| Outstanding Graphic Design - Specialty | Outstanding Studio or Production Design/Art Direction |
| **Noche UFC****: "For Mexico, For All Time"** **– Animation and Graphics Team (ESPN / ESPN2/ ESPN+ / UFC Fight Pass)**; In the Arena: Serena Williams – Juan Delcan, Steven Do, Chelsea Marotta, Johnathan Minayah, Kellan Mooney, Ryan Policky, Adam Schmisek, Aaron Schurman, Cindy Soohoo, Hollee Winans, Phil Hoeschen, Amanda Li Jing Koh, Lauren Fisher, Kennon Fleisher, Ben Hurand (Disney+ / ESPN+); NBA All-Star on TNT: "Borg-Warner Talking Heads" – Ian Samson, David Johnson, Drew Watkins, States Beall (TNT); NBA on TNT: " Unforgettable" – Courtney Culp, Charles Fox, Chris Francis, Eric King, Michelle Ma, Charlie Owens, Jeff Brody, Jonathan Davis, Matt Guerrero, Mike Thompson, Stephanie White, Drew Watkins, James Glenn, Tyler Lassiter, Matt Lucas, Craig Murray, Chris Poppleton, Anthony Baker, Sean McPherson (TNT); NFL Draft: "2024 NFL DRAFT OPEN" – Ian Mork, Lexi Morgan, Stefan Warren, Ian Ballantyne, Zak Perry, Aidan Strickland, Ryan Travis, Greg Walter, Heather Shaw (NFL Network); Super Bowl LIX: "Coach Jimmy Johnson" – Dan Schmit, David Kogen, Jim Rodman, Chris Smith, Tim Coleman, Eric Heavens, Luc Begin, Daniel Olaizola, David Piedra, Michael Roderick, Gary Hartley, Remington Scott, Michael Caplan, Adam Simpson, David Summers, Jonah Hall (FOX) | **Noche UFC: "UFC 306 at Noche UFC" – Craig Borsari, Mark Bracco, Zach Candito, Linda Gierahn, Baz Halpin, Chris Kartzmark, Heidi Noland, Dana White, Nick Brown, Valerie Bush, Tom Colbourne, Richard Cullen, Tucker Greene, Carlos López Estrada, Vincent Richards, JT Rooney, Kate Jelks, Francesca Benevento, Bobby Besabe, Craig Bragg, Alon Cohen, David Fafard, Rami Genauer, Kari Hubert, Jonathan Masterson, Kristin Brown (ESPN / ESPN2 / ESPN+ / UFC Fight Pass)**; FOX Summer of Soccer: "The Soccer Palace" – Production Design Team (FOX / FS1); Games of the XXXIII Olympiad – Tripp Dixon, Joseph Lee, Scott Duncan, Peter Frankfurt, Josh Goldman, Ian Milham, Jeremy Quayhackx, Don Simon, Alan Williams, Matt Hall, David Barton, George Morrow (NBC / Peacock); NHL Draft – Steve Mayer, Paul Conway, Thomas Neese, Falk Rosenthal, John Bochiaro, Steve Marchand, Matt McAdam, Angel DelValle, Greg Mueller (ESPN); Super Bowl LIX: "The Huddle" – PT Navarro, Mark Ruberg, Brian Alexander, Faolan Curtin-Orsmond, Scott Freeman, Bryce Johnson, Jordan Dawes, Monica Garate, Rush Gomez, Oscar Huezo, Richie Jacobo, Dimitri Kornakov, Raymundo Moreno, Ken Russell, Georgia Stuart, Linn Tabudlong (FOX) |
The George Wensel Technical Achievement Award
**2024 PGA Tour: "Drone AR" – Dr. John Duesler, Jon Freedman, James Japhet, Brian Kaufmann, Joe Martin, Steve Milton, Tommy Roy, Sellers Shy, Ben Taylor, Alex Turnbull (CBS / NBC / PGA Tour)**; 2024 PGA Tour: "OptiMotion" – Joe Assell, Nick Clearwater, Jason Cohen, Michael Decker, Ross Molloy, Patty Power, Sellers Shy, Drew Simon, Craig Simons, Craig Stevens (CBS); Games of the XXXIII Olympiad: "Immersive Audio at Scale" – Michael DiCrescenzo, Nuno Duarte, Darryl Jefferson, Taro Johnson, David Letson, Brian Longenecker, Karl Malone, Cherylene McKinney, Jim Starzynski, Rodrigo Thomaz (NBC / Peacock); NFL Live: "StatusPro Visualizer - VR Technology" – Carl Baker, Erik Barone, Michael Berger, Michael Doom, Timothy Farrell, Andrew Hawkins, Josh Helmrich, Troy Jones, Daniel Orlovsky, Brett O'Neil (ESPN); Simpson's Funday Football, NBA Dunk the Halls & NHL Big City Greens Classic: "Modified Character Scaling" – Giuseppe Anfuso, Edsart Boelens, Daan Eertink, Tess Glastra van Loon, Jeff Nelson, Phil Orlins, Sander Schouten, Ashley Ward, Nicolaas Westerhof, Stan Zutt (ESPN2 / ESPN+ / Disney Channel / Disney XD / Disney+); Thursday Night Football: "AI Feature Latency" – Yossi Biton, Charlie Hoppe, Alex Kofman, Stephen Leotta, Ilan Rackover, Betsy Riley, Alex Strand, Hans Weber, David Williams, Brad Woodall (Prime Video)

== Multiple wins ==
Shows and Events receiving multiple wins

| Wins | Show / Event | Network Group |
|---|---|---|
| 10 | Games of the XXXIII Olympiad | NBC |
| 2 | Noche UFC | ESPN / UFC Fight Pass |
| 2 | SportsCenter | ESPN |

Network Groups receiving multiple wins

| Wins | Network Group | Parent Company | Network Group includes: |
|---|---|---|---|
| 13 | ESPN | The Walt Disney Company | ESPN, ABC, ESPN2, ESPN Deportes, Disney Channel, Disney XD, ESPN+, Disney+ |
| 13 | NBC | NBCUniversal | NBC, USA Network, Golf Channel, Peacock, NBCOlympics.com, Telemundo, Universo |
| 7 | FOX | Fox Corporation | FOX, FS1, FS2, Fox Deportes, FOX Digital |
| 4 | Netflix | Netflix, Inc. | Netflix |
| 3 | TNT | Warner Bros. Discovery | TNT, tbs, TruTV |
| 2 | CBS | Paramount Global | CBS, CBS Sports Network, CBS Golazo Network, Paramount+, Nickelodeon |
| 2 | UFC Fight Pass | TKO Group Holdings | UFC Fight Pass |
