= Angel Reese =

American basketball player (born 2002)

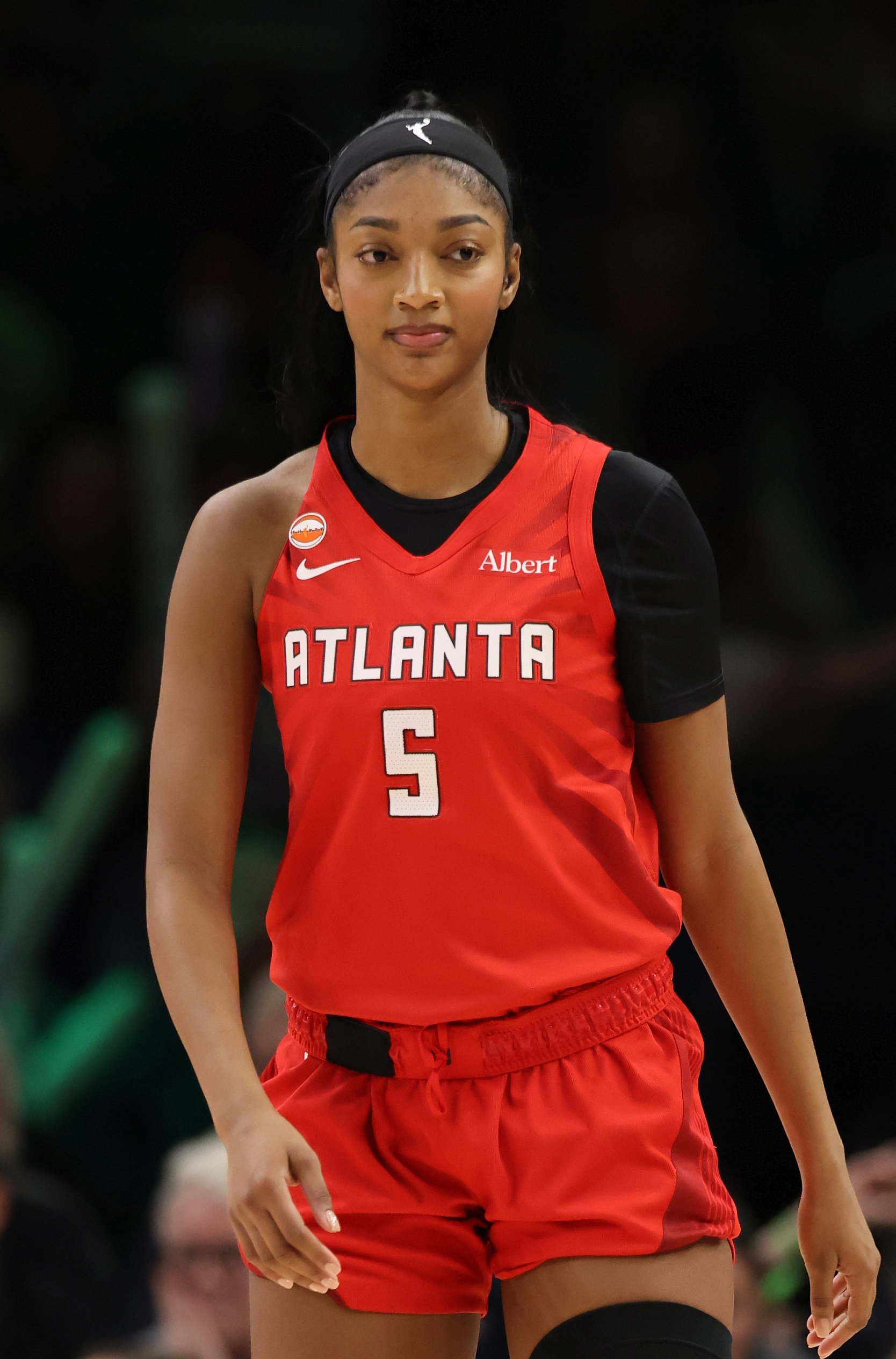
- Reese with the Atlanta Dream in 2026

No. 5 – Atlanta Dream
- Position: Power forward
- League: WNBA

Personal information
- Born: May 6, 2002 (age 24) Randallstown, Maryland, U.S.
- Listed height: 6 ft 4 in (1.93 m)
- Listed weight: 165 lb (75 kg)

Career information
- High school: Saint Frances Academy (Baltimore, Maryland)
- College: Maryland (2020–2022); LSU (2022–2024)
- WNBA draft: 2024: 1st round, 7th overall pick
- Drafted by: Chicago Sky
- Playing career: 2024–present

Career history
- 2024–2025: Chicago Sky
- 2025–2026: Rose
- 2026–present: Atlanta Dream

Career highlights
- WNBA Defensive Player of the Year (2026); All-WNBA Second Team (2026); WNBA All-Defensive First Team (2026); 3× WNBA All-Star (2024–2026); WNBA All-Rookie Team (2024); 3× WNBA rebounding leader (2024–2026); 3× WNBA Peak Performer (2024–2026); Unrivaled Defensive Player of the Year (2025); All-Unrivaled Second Team (2025); Unrivaled champion (2025); NCAA champion (2023); NCAA Tournament MOP (2023); Unanimous first-team All-American (2023); 2× First-team All-American – USBWA (2023, 2024); 2× WBCA Coaches' All-American (2023, 2024); Second-team All-American – AP (2024); Third-team All-American – AP (2022); SEC Player of the Year (2024); 2× First-team All-SEC (2023, 2024); First-team All-Big Ten (2022); 2× SEC All-Defensive Team (2023, 2024); Big Ten All-Defensive Team (2022); Big Ten All-Freshman Team (2021); McDonald's All-American (2020)
- Stats at Basketball Reference
Medals
Women's basketball
Representing United States
FIBA World Cup
Gold medal – first place	2026 Germany
FIBA AmeriCup
Silver medal – second place	2023 Mexico	Team

Angel Reese (born May 6, 2002) is an American professional basketball player for the Atlanta Dream of the Women's National Basketball Association (WNBA) and formerly Rose of Unrivaled. Nicknamed the "Bayou Barbie", she played college basketball for the Maryland Terrapins and LSU Tigers.

Reese attended Saint Frances Academy in Baltimore, Maryland, where she was awarded McDonald's All-American honors in 2020 and was ranked the number two player in her class by ESPN. She joined the Maryland Terrapins as the highest-ranked recruit in program history, but her freshman season in 2020–21 was interrupted by a fractured right foot. She was named a third-team All-American by the Associated Press as a sophomore. In her junior season, Reese transferred to LSU and was a unanimous first-team All-American selection. She led LSU to its first national championship, where she was Most Outstanding Player. Reese set the NCAA single-season record in double-doubles and the SEC single-season record in rebounds. As a senior, she was named SEC Player of the Year and an All-American.

Reese was selected by the Chicago Sky with the seventh overall pick in the 2024 WNBA draft. In her rookie season, she was named an WNBA All-Star and set the league single-season rebounding record. After earning her second All-Star selection with the Sky, Reese was traded to the Atlanta Dream in 2026. At the international level, she helped the United States win a gold medal at the 2026 FIBA World Cup.

== Early life ==
Angel Reese was born on May 6, 2002, in Randallstown, Maryland, to Angel and Michael Reese. She learned how to play basketball from her mother at a very young age and grew up playing against her brother, Julian, in their driveway. Reese competed in a recreational league in Baltimore County, where her mother also played. She emerged as one of the best players in the city and had success playing above her age group and on boys' teams. Reese played the point guard position before having two growth spurts by her first year of high school. In addition to basketball, she took part in ballet, gymnastics, swimming, and track during her childhood. Reese often attended Washington Mystics games and drew inspiration from Women's National Basketball Association (WNBA) players Candace Parker and Maya Moore, as well as former National Basketball Association (NBA) player and Baltimore native Muggsy Bogues. She was coached by Ron James with Team Takeover, an Amateur Athletic Union (AAU) program based in Washington, D.C. that competes in the Nike Elite Youth Basketball League (EYBL), a national circuit. Her AAU teammates included Madison Scott, Mir McLean and Jakia Brown-Turner, all of whom were given five-star ratings by ESPN at the end of their high school careers.

== High school ==
Reese attended St. Frances Academy in Baltimore, Maryland, where she was a four-year varsity basketball player under head coach Jerome Shelton. Early in her career, she was teammates with future WNBA player Nia Clouden. Due to her size and athleticism, she could play all five positions and entered the starting lineup midway through her first season. As a freshman, Reese averaged 11.1 points and 11 rebounds per game, earning All-Metro first team honors from The Baltimore Sun. She helped her team win the Interscholastic Athletic Association of Maryland (IAAM) A Conference title and finish the season with a 30–1 record. Her team suffered its only loss to Hamilton Heights Christian Academy at the High School Nationals semifinals, where Reese recorded 20 points and 24 rebounds and made a putback shot to beat the buzzer and send the game to overtime. She was named to the High School Nationals all-tournament team.

In her sophomore season, Reese repeated as an All-Metro first-team selection, helping St. Frances win the IAAM A Conference championship and finish 24–4. She averaged 17.6 points, 12.1 rebounds, 3.1 assists and 1.8 blocks per game, leading her team in all four categories. Following the season, Reese played in the Capital Classic and was named her team's most valuable player after guiding the United States Future Stars to a 115–80 win over the Capital All-Stars. She was suspended early in her junior season after punching an opposing player in the face during a preseason scrimmage; no charges were filed. Reese averaged 22.6 points and 19.3 rebounds per game as a junior and was named All-Metro Player of the Year by The Baltimore Sun after leading St. Frances to the IAAM A Conference title. That year, she led Team Takeover to the Nike EYBL championship, posting 18 points and 11 rebounds in a 57–47 win over All Iowa Attack in the final.

In January 2020, Archbishop Spalding High School head coach Lisa Smith was fired after her private messages on Instagram criticizing Reese's behavior were made public. Reese's mother felt that the messages included racial overtones by attributing Reese's success to being genetically gifted. On January 31, Reese's number 10 jersey was retired by St. Frances, and she became the first female player to receive the honor. As a senior, she averaged 18.6 points, 10.2 rebounds, 3.4 assists, and 2.5 blocks per game, winning her fourth straight IAAM A Conference championship and helping her team finish with a 25–3 record. Reese was selected to play at the McDonald's All-American Game and the Jordan Brand Classic, two major high school all-star games, but both were canceled due to the COVID-19 pandemic. She repeated as All-Metro Player of the Year and was also named High School Female Athlete of the Year by The Baltimore Sun. Reese finished her career with 1,720 points, second in St. Frances history to Melba Chambers, and 1,250 rebounds.

In addition to basketball, Reese was a member of the volleyball team at St. Frances, playing the outside hitter position. In her freshman season, she helped the team win the IAAM C Conference championship, the school's first IAAM title in a sport other than basketball. Reese led St. Frances to another IAAM C Conference title as a sophomore.

=== Recruiting ===
Reese was considered a five-star recruit, the number two player and the top wing in the 2020 class by ESPN. By her junior season of high school, she held scholarship offers from over 24 NCAA Division I basketball programs, including Maryland, South Carolina and Louisville. On November 1, 2019, she announced her commitment to Maryland, becoming the highest-ranked recruit in program history. Her other finalists were South Carolina, USC, Syracuse and Tennessee. On November 13, Reese signed a National Letter of Intent with the program. She was drawn to Maryland because of its proximity to her home, head coach Brenda Frese, who had recruited her since eighth grade, and assistant coach Shay Robinson. She preferred to play with a post player in Shakira Austin, who instead transferred from the program before Reese's first season. She was also attracted to Maryland by its strong academics and the Philip Merrill College of Journalism.

== College career ==
=== Freshman season ===
Reese entered her freshman season in the starting lineup for Maryland, primarily as a power forward. Despite being a freshman, she was praised by head coach Brenda Frese for her leadership. Frese viewed Reese as part of the team's Big Three that also included Ashley Owusu and Diamond Miller. On November 27, 2020, she made her debut for Maryland, recording a season-high 20 points and nine rebounds in a 94–72 win over Davidson at the Gulf Coast Challenge. In her fourth game, on December 3 against Towson, she suffered a Jones fracture in her right foot after landing awkwardly during the opening minutes. She underwent surgery and was sidelined until February 23, 2021. Reese came off the bench following her return from injury. She helped Maryland win Big Ten regular season and tournament titles. At the end of the regular season, she was named to the Big Ten All-Freshman Team. On March 24, 2021, in the second round of the NCAA tournament, Reese scored 19 points to help second-seeded Maryland defeat seventh-seeded Alabama, 100–64. In the Sweet 16, her team was upset by sixth-seeded Texas, 64–61. As a freshman, Reese averaged ten points and six rebounds per game. Following the season, she won a silver medal with the Maryland 3x3 team at the USA Basketball 3X Nationals.

=== Sophomore season ===
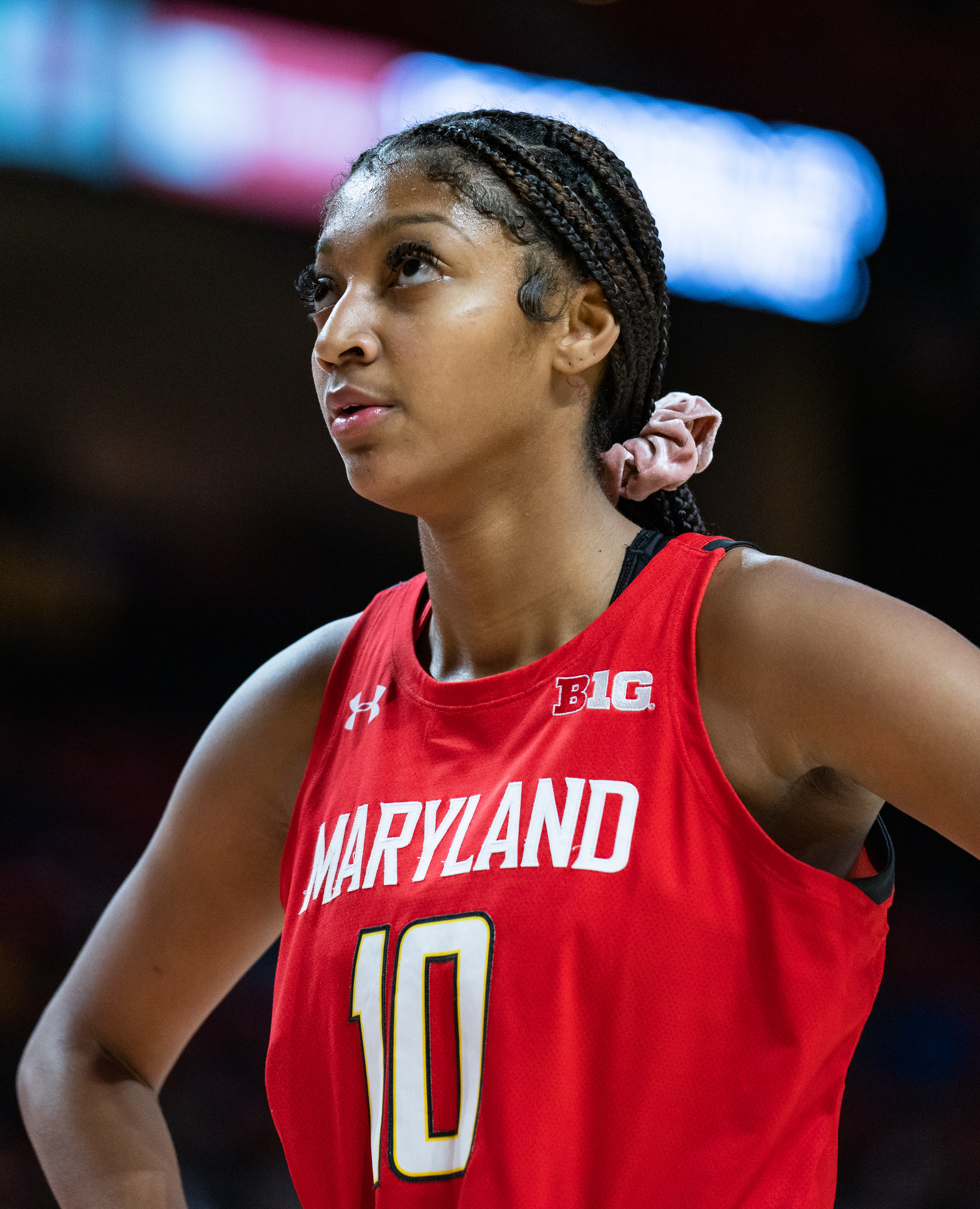
Reese with Maryland in 2022

Reese returned to a starting role in her sophomore season. She described the season as a "redemption year" and regained confidence from before her injury as a freshman. In her season debut on November 9, Reese recorded 21 points and 14 rebounds in a 97–67 win against Longwood. On December 2, 2021, Reese had a season-high 26 points and 15 rebounds in an 82–74 win against Miami (Florida) in the ACC–Big Ten Challenge. On February 14, 2022, she posted 25 points and 13 rebounds in an 81–69 victory over Iowa. Reese was named first-team All-Big Ten and made the conference's All-Defensive Team. She led fourth-seeded Maryland to the Sweet 16 of the 2022 NCAA tournament, where she recorded 25 points, 9 rebounds, 3 steals and 3 blocks in a 72–66 loss to first-seeded Stanford on March 25. Reese received third-team All-American honors from the AP and made the United States Basketball Writers Association (USBWA) and Women's Basketball Coaches Association (WBCA) All-American honorable mention. As a sophomore, she averaged 17.8 points and 10.6 rebounds per game, becoming the first Maryland player to average a double-double since Angie Scott in 1975.

On April 5, 2022, Reese entered the transfer portal with several of her teammates. She later explained that she wanted a fresh start and a coach who would develop her into a stretch four to prepare her for the WNBA. She was the most heralded transfer in the nation and took visits to Louisiana State University (LSU), South Carolina and Tennessee. She took interest in LSU after Ohio State transfer Kateri Poole, whom she had known since high school, suggested that they visit the school together.

=== Junior season ===
On May 6, 2022, LSU announced that Reese would transfer to their program. She made the decision due to her trust in head coach Kim Mulkey and a desire to join a "winning culture". Reese was also impressed by the school's interest in the women's team. On November 7, she made her debut for LSU, recording 31 points and 13 rebounds in a 125–50 win over Bellarmine. Reese posted 32 points and 15 rebounds in an 88–42 victory over Lamar on December 14. She surpassed LSU's single-game rebounding record, held by Maree Jackson since 1977, during a 26-point, 28-rebound performance in a 74–34 win over Texas A&M on January 5, 2023. Reese had her 20th straight double-double on January 23, with 14 points and 14 rebounds in an 89–51 win against Alabama. She broke the program record for consecutive double-doubles, set by Sylvia Fowles during the 2006–07 season. On February 16, Reese had a career-high 36 points and 20 rebounds in a 69–60 win over Ole Miss. She earned first-team All-Southeastern Conference (SEC) and All-Defensive Team honors at the end of the regular season. In the first round of the 2023 NCAA tournament, she recorded 34 points and 15 rebounds in a 73–50 win against Hawaii. Reese posted 25 points, 24 rebounds and 6 blocks in a 66–42 second-round win over Michigan. In the Elite Eight, she registered her 32nd double-double, breaking the SEC single-season record held by Teaira McCowan of Mississippi State. Reese was named Most Outstanding Player (MOP) of the Greenville Regional 2. In the Final Four, she set the program and SEC single-season rebounding records after posting 24 points and 12 rebounds in a 79–72 win over Virginia Tech.

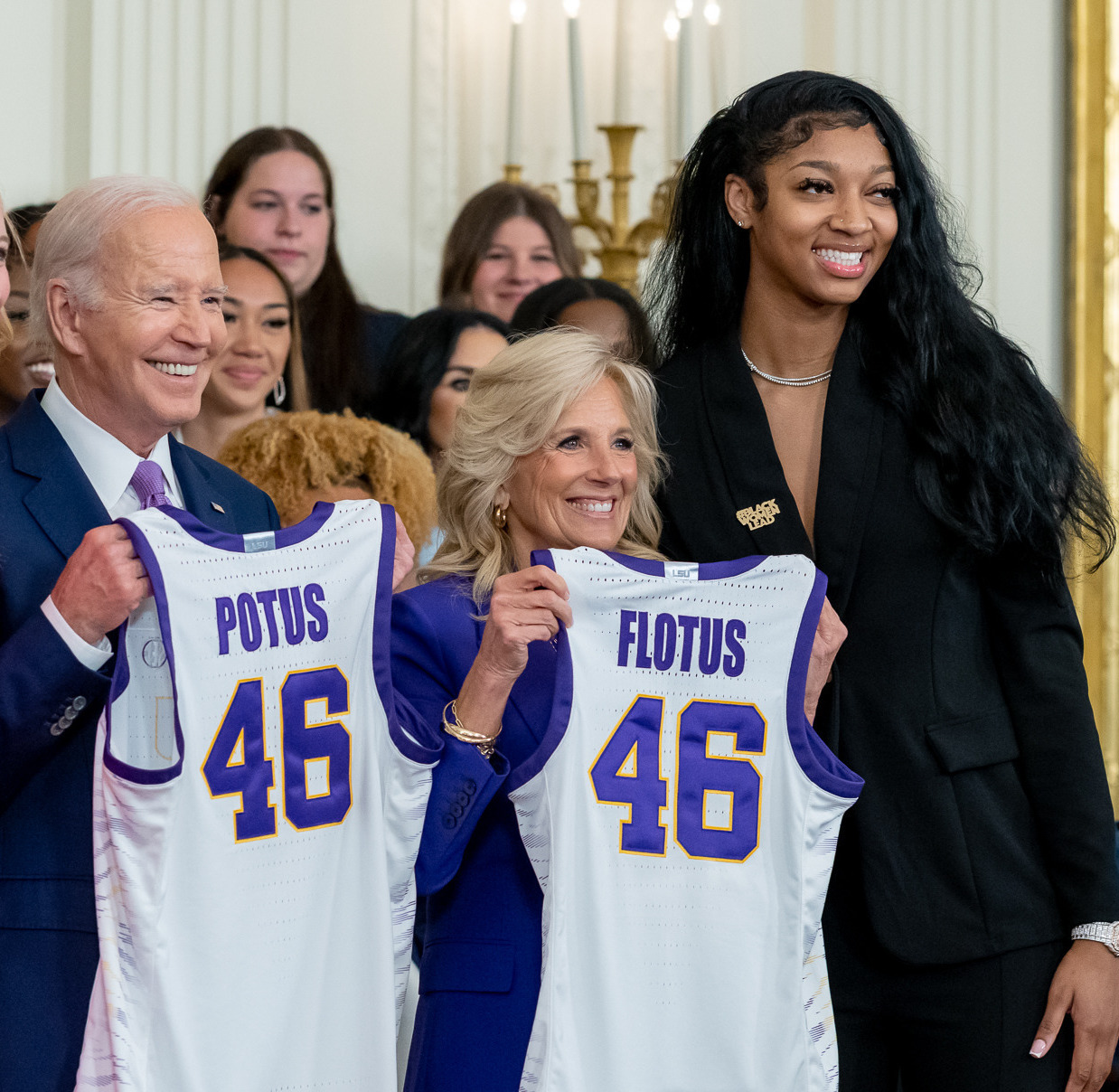
Reese with President Joe Biden and First Lady Jill Biden during her team's visit to the White House in 2023

Reese helped LSU win its first national championship, posting 15 points, 10 rebounds, and five assists in a 102–85 victory over Iowa in the title game. She won the tournament Most Outstanding Player award and set the NCAA single-season record with 34 double-doubles. In the closing minutes of the game, Reese followed Iowa star Caitlin Clark around the court and made a "you can't see me" gesture by waving her hand in front of her face—a taunt popularized by professional wrestler John Cena—before pointing to her ring finger in reference to a championship ring. Her actions came under scrutiny, with some journalists and analysts criticizing her for poor sportsmanship and others, including Reese herself, pointing to a double standard, because Clark had not received similar backlash for making the "you can't see me" gesture two games earlier. Clark later defended Reese from criticism over the gesture. The incident drew attention to the roles of race and gender in the perception of trash talk in sports since Reese is Black and Clark is White. It has also been described as the origin of a rivalry between Reese and Clark. Following the game, First Lady Jill Biden remarked that she wanted Iowa to be invited to the White House along with LSU, as an addition to the custom of the president and first lady hosting the national champions. Despite Biden's press secretary clarifying that only LSU would be invited, Reese initially declined the invitation, saying she would prefer to celebrate with the Obamas, before accepting it with her team later that week. President Joe Biden called Reese individually to congratulate her on LSU's victory.

Reese was a unanimous first-team All-American: she earned first-team All-American honors from the AP and the USBWA, and made the WBCA Coaches' All-America Team. As a junior, she averaged 23 points and 15.4 rebounds per game, becoming the first women's player in over 15 seasons to reach those marks. Reese led the NCAA Division I in total rebounds and offensive rebounds per game and ranked second to Lauren Gustin of BYU in rebounds per game. Her 240 free throws made marked an SEC record, and she scored 830 points, the third-most in LSU history. After the season, she won the BET Award for Sportswoman of the Year and the Best Breakthrough Athlete ESPY Award. She received the Corbett Award as the top female amateur athlete in Louisiana.

=== Senior season ===
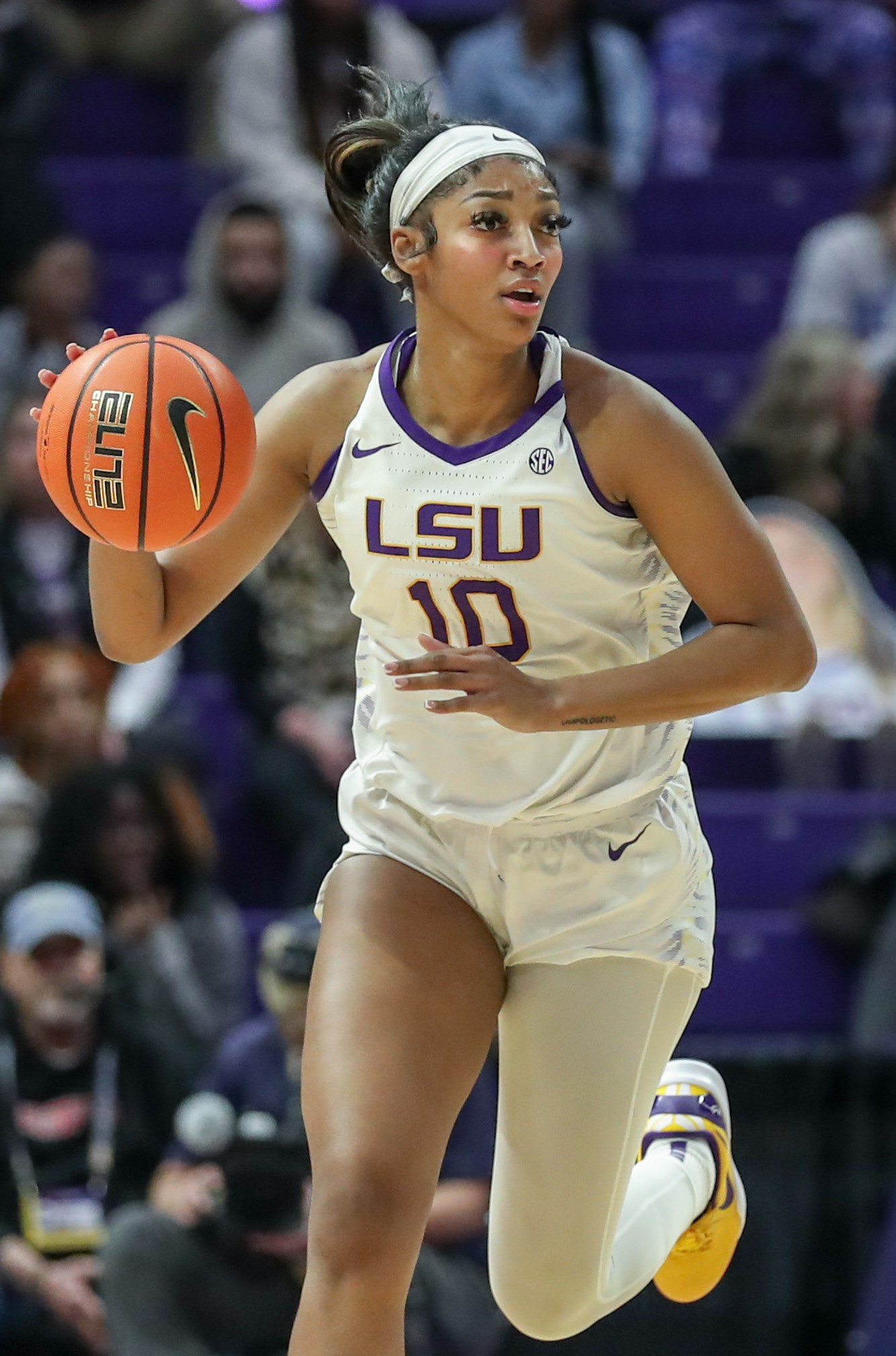
Reese with the LSU Tigers in 2024

Entering her senior season, Reese was named an AP preseason All-American and preseason SEC Player of the Year. LSU was ranked number one by the AP in its preseason poll, with incoming transfers Hailey Van Lith and Aneesah Morrow. On November 6, 2023, Reese recorded 15 points and 12 rebounds in her season debut, as her team suffered an upset loss to AP No. 20 Colorado, 92–78. On November 14, 2023, she had 11 points and five rebounds in a 109–79 win over Kent State but was benched for the second half, which Mulkey described as a coach's decision and did not elaborate. Reese did not play in LSU's next four games for undisclosed reasons. Mulkey later attributed Reese's absence to locker room issues. On November 30, Reese returned, posting 19 points and nine rebounds in an 82–64 win over AP No. 9 Virginia Tech. On December 19, she shared Sporting News Athlete of the Year honors with Caitlin Clark. At the end of the regular season, Reese was named SEC Player of the Year while earning first-team All-SEC and All-Defensive Team recognition from the league's coaches. She led LSU to the Elite Eight of the 2024 NCAA tournament, where she had 17 points and 20 rebounds in a 94–87 loss to one-seed Iowa in a rematch of the 2023 national championship game.

For her second straight season, Reese was named a first-team All-American by the USBWA and a WBCA Coaches' All-American. She earned second-team All-American honors from the AP. Reese averaged 18.6 points and 13.4 rebounds per game as a senior, ranking second to Lauren Gustin in rebounding among Division I players. During two years at LSU, she averaged 14.4 rebounds per game, the most in SEC history. On April 3, 2024, Reese declared for the 2024 WNBA draft, where she was projected to be a first-round pick.

== Professional career ==
=== Chicago Sky ===
==== 2024 ====
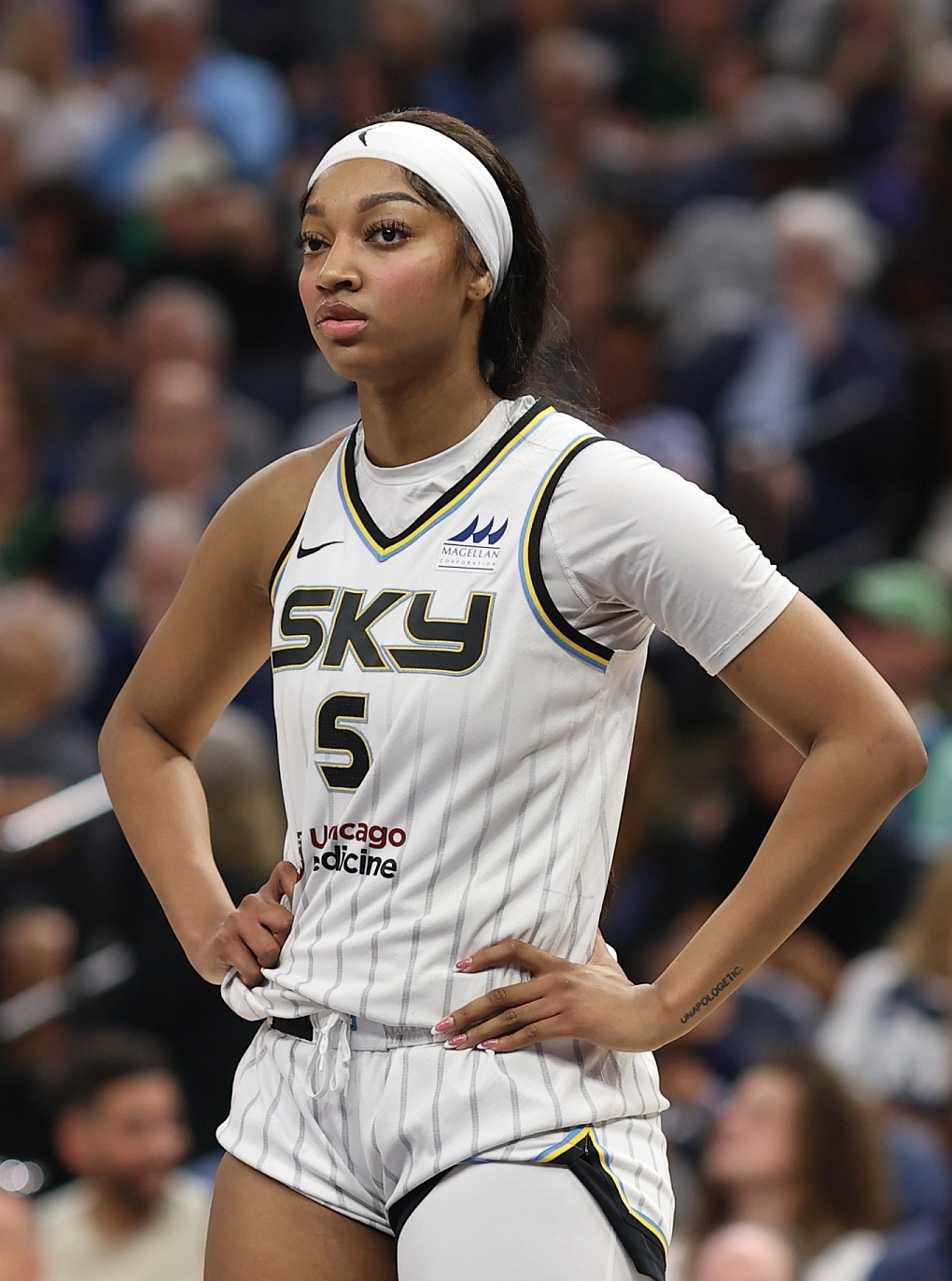
Reese with the Chicago Sky in 2024

Reese was selected as the seventh overall pick in the 2024 WNBA draft by the Chicago Sky. On May 15, 2024, she made her WNBA debut, posting 12 points and eight rebounds in an 87–79 loss to the Dallas Wings. On June 2, Reese was fined $1,000 for not making herself available to reporters after a loss to the Indiana Fever, in which her teammate Chennedy Carter committed a hard foul on Caitlin Clark of the Fever. On June 20, she had her seventh consecutive double-double, the longest such streak by a WNBA rookie, after posting 16 points and 18 rebounds in an 83–72 win over the Dallas Wings. In her next game, three days later, Reese tallied 25 points and 16 rebounds in an 88–87 victory over the Indiana Fever. On June 30, she registered her 10th straight double-double, with 10 points and 16 rebounds in a 70–62 loss to the Minnesota Lynx, surpassing Candace Parker of the Los Angeles Sparks for the longest single-season streak in WNBA history.

Reese was named the league's Rookie of the Month in June, after averaging 14.5 points and 13.2 rebounds per game. On July 2, 2024, she was selected to play in the WNBA All-Star Game. On July 7, Reese had her 13th consecutive double-double, with 17 points and 14 rebounds in an 84–71 loss to the Seattle Storm, and passed Parker for the longest streak across multiple seasons. The streak ultimately extended to 15 games. Reese became the first rookie to have a double-double in a WNBA All-Star Game, finishing with 12 points and 11 rebounds in a 117–109 win over the United States national team. On August 25, she grabbed at least 20 rebounds for a third straight game in a 77–75 loss to the Las Vegas Aces; no WNBA player had previously reached the mark in consecutive games. On September 1, Reese broke the WNBA single-season rebounding record held by Sylvia Fowles as part of a 17-point, 19-rebound effort in a 79–74 loss to the Minnesota Lynx. Reese's rookie season ended on September 6, when she sustained a hairline fracture in her wrist during the Sky's game against the Los Angeles Sparks. She finished the year averaging 13.6 points and a WNBA-record 13.1 rebounds per game.

==== 2025 ====
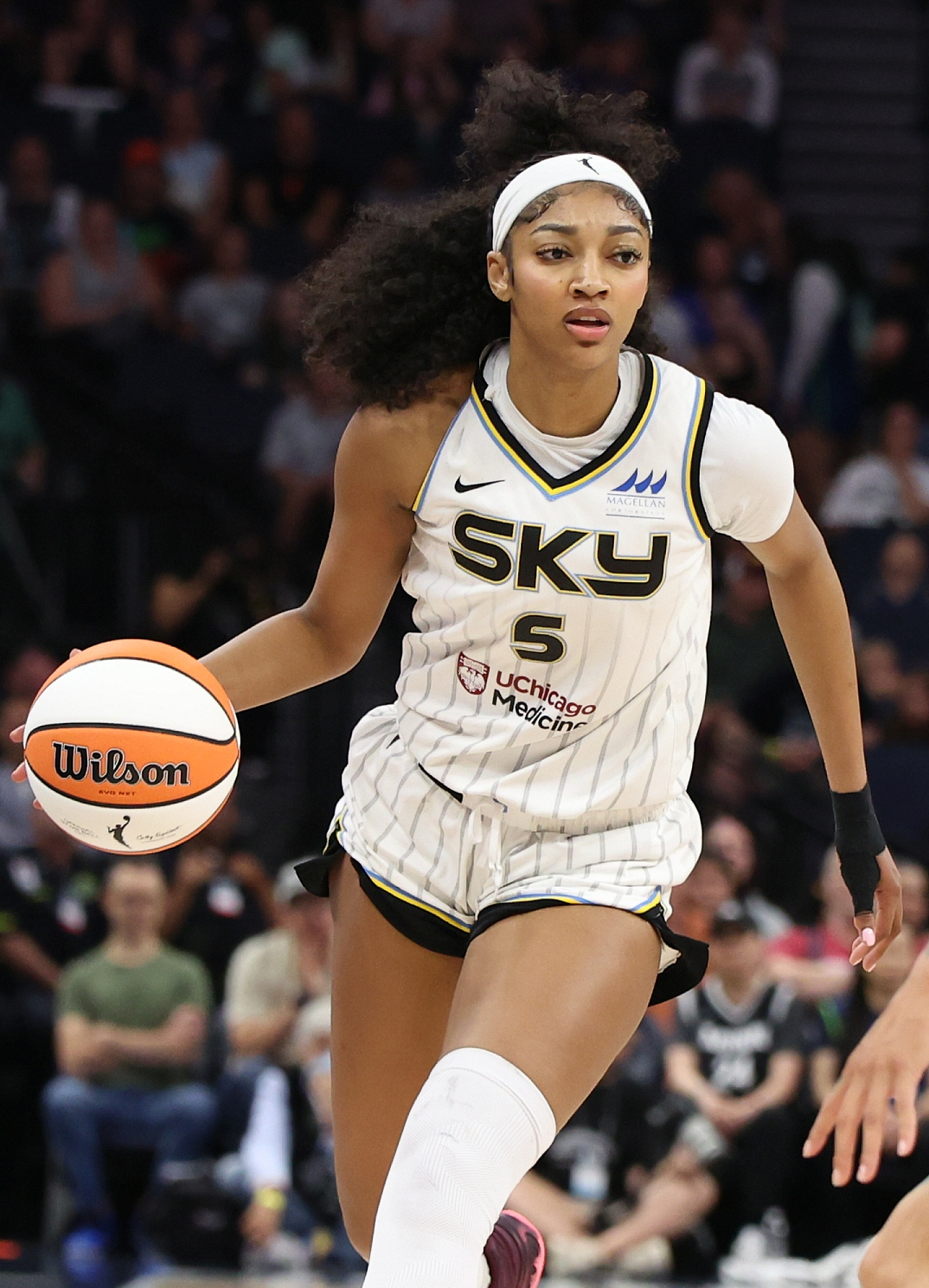
Reese in 2025

On May 17, 2025, Reese made her season debut with 12 points and 17 rebounds in a 93–58 loss to the Indiana Fever. On June 15, she recorded her first career triple-double, with 11 points, 13 rebounds, and 11 assists in a 78–66 win over the Connecticut Sun. She became the second-youngest player in WNBA history, behind only Caitlin Clark, to achieve the feat. On June 29, Reese had a season-high 24 points and 16 rebounds in a 92–85 victory over the Los Angeles Sparks. It was the fifth of six consecutive games with at least 15 rebounds, which set a league record. On July 6, she received her second WNBA All-Star Game selection. Reese missed nine games, including seven straight in August, with a back injury. Before a game on September 3, the Chicago Tribune published an article in which Reese openly voiced her frustrations about the team's performance, with the Sky missing the playoffs for a second straight season. In that game, she received her eighth technical foul of the year, resulting in an automatic league suspension for the September 5 matchup against the Fever. The Sky additionally handed Reese a half-game suspension for the September 7 game against the Aces for making "statements detrimental to the team" in her Tribune interview. However, she did not play in the game due to back issues and missed the Sky's final two games. In 30 games, she averaged 14.7 points, a league-high 12.6 rebounds, and 3.7 assists per game.

=== Atlanta Dream ===
==== 2026 ====
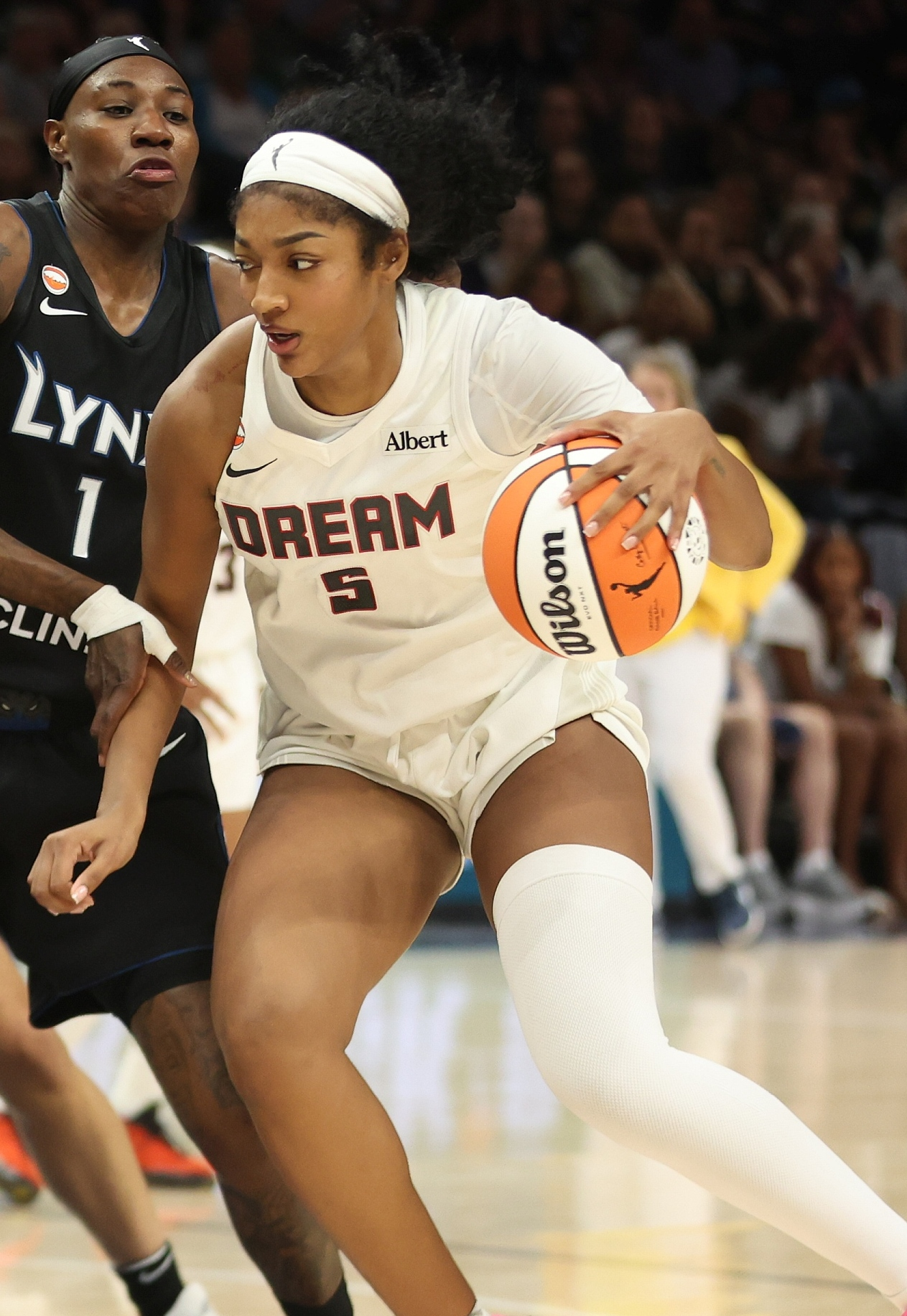
Reese with the Atlanta Dream in 2026

On April 6, 2026, Reese was traded to the Atlanta Dream in exchange for first-round draft picks in 2027 and 2028. As part of the trade, Atlanta received the right to swap second-round picks with the Chicago Sky in 2028. In her first game, Reese recorded 11 points and 14 rebounds, and after Dream led the game for the first time with 12 seconds left, Reese made the game-saving block with one second left to beat Minnesota Lynx 91-90. On June 20, Reese became the fastest player in WNBA history to record 1,000 career rebounds, reaching the mark in 79 games. She was named an All-Star for a third time.

Reese recorded the longest scoring streak in Atlanta Dream history on August 20th against Los Angeles Sparks, going 9 for 9. She had the most efficient 20-10 game in history, in addition to 8 assists and 3 steals. On August 22th, Reese posted a career-high 31 points and 14 rebounds in a 99–89 win over the Phoenix Mercury, helping the Dream clinch a playoff spot. Three days later against the Sparks, she set the record for most rebounds in a game with 26, surpassing the previous record of 24 set by Chamique Holdsclaw in 2003. During this game, she also surpassed the single-season rebounding record set by A'ja Wilson in 2024. On August 30th against Minnesota Lynx, Reese set the WNBA record with her 29th double-double, eclipsing Alyssa Thomas for most in a season.

Reese won her first Defensive Player of the Year award, averaging 16.4 points, 12.1 rebounds, 2.8 assists, and 1.8 steals, while leading the league with 32 double-doubles.

=== Unrivaled ===
On July 24, 2024, it was announced that Reese would appear and play in the inaugural season of Unrivaled, a new women's 3-on-3 basketball league founded by Napheesa Collier and Breanna Stewart. She was selected for Rose BC, debuting on January 17, 2025 as a starter, and scoring the first points in the team's history. Her performance was praised, and she recorded a double-double. In Rose's ninth game of the season, they defeated the only previously undefeated team, Lunar Owls. In this game, Reese became the first player in the league to achieve a 20–20 game, with 22 points and 21 rebounds.

For the 2025 season, Reese was named to the All-Unrivaled Second Team and was awarded Unrivaled's Defensive Player of the Year. Rose won the first ever Unrivaled championship.

Reese was originally not part of the 2026 Unrivaled season, but on February 11, 2026, the league announced that Reese was joining Rose for the rest of the season. She played her first game on February 20, recording 13 points and 8 rebounds in 10 minutes of play.

== National team career ==
Reese attended trials for the United States team for the 2017 FIBA Under-16 Americas Championship but was not named to the final roster. She missed the cut for the 2018 Under-17 World Cup team after being a finalist. Reese was named a finalist for the 2019 Under-19 World Cup team before withdrawing to play in the Nike EYBL. She withdrew from consideration for the 2021 Under-19 World Cup for health reasons after receiving an invitation to team trials and being a finalist.

Reese made her United States national team debut at the 2023 FIBA AmeriCup in Mexico. In her first game, she posted 11 points and 9 rebounds in an 80–54 win over Venezuela. Reese recorded 13 points and 18 rebounds in a 68–49 victory over Colombia in the quarterfinals. She helped her team win the silver medal, posting four points and six rebounds in a 69–58 loss to Brazil in the final.

Reese made her debut for the senior national team on March 11, 2026 for the World Cup Qualifying Tournaments. She was named to the Team USA roster for the 2026 FIBA World Cup, where she helped Team USA win a gold medal in Berlin, Germany.

== Player profile ==
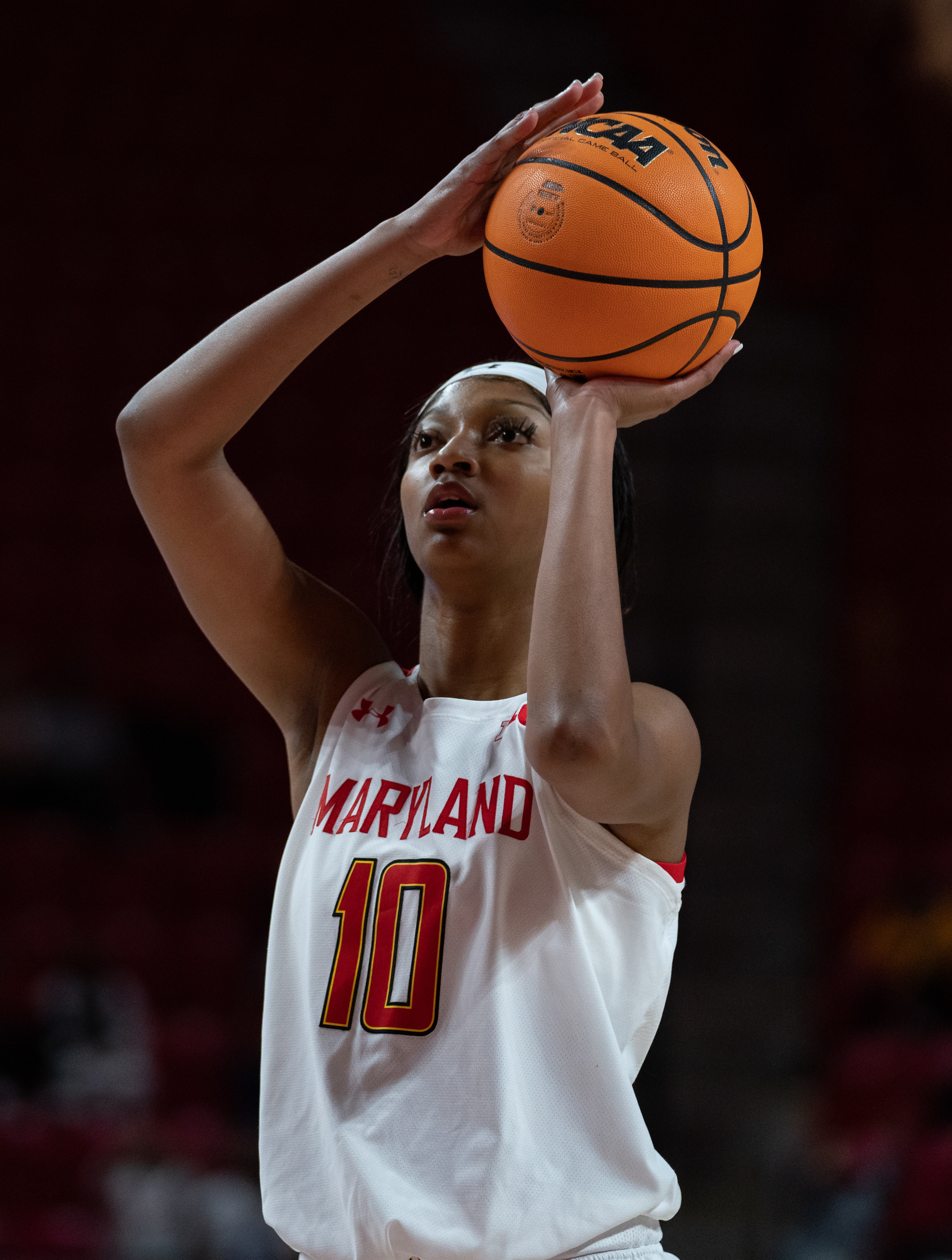
Reese shoots a free throw in 2021.

Reese has a listed height of 6 feet 4 inches (1.93 m) and primarily plays the small forward and power forward positions. She has described herself as a "big guard", having played the position in her childhood, and can handle and pass the ball. Reese has exceptional mobility for her size and is explosive to the basket. She is an outstanding rebounder due to her athleticism, anticipation and tenacity, often scoring off putbacks. On defense, her agility allows her to guard perimeter players, and her long wingspan helps her record steals and blocks at a high rate. Early in her college career, Reese struggled with committing fouls, before showing improvement in her junior season. Her shooting outside the paint has been labeled as a weakness, and she rarely attempts three-pointers. She has drawn comparisons to Nneka Ogwumike and NaLyssa Smith. She has modeled her game after NBA players Kevin Durant and Ben Simmons, and WNBA players Candace Parker and A'ja Wilson. Reese is known for her assertive personality and trash talk. Brenda Frese, her head coach at Maryland, compared Reese's competitiveness to her former player, Shatori Walker-Kimbrough.

== Career statistics ==
Legend
GP	Games played	GS	Games started	MPG	Minutes per game	RPG	Rebounds per game
APG	Assists per game	SPG	Steals per game	BPG	Blocks per game	PPG	Points per game
TO	Turnovers per game	FG%	Field-goal percentage	3P%	3-point field-goal percentage	FT%	Free-throw percentage
**Bold**	Career best	°	League leader

*	Denotes season(s) in which Reese won an NCAA Championship
‡	WNBA record

=== WNBA ===
==== Regular season ====
WNBA regular season statistics
Year	Team	GP	GS	MPG	FG%	3P%	FT%	RPG	APG	SPG	BPG	TO	PPG
2024	Chicago	34	34	**32.5**	.391	.188	.736	**13.1**‡	1.9	1.3	0.5	**2.2**	13.6
2025	Chicago	30	30	31.6	**.458**	.182	**.756**	12.6°	**3.7**	1.5	**.7**	3.9	14.7
2026	Atlanta	**43**	**43**	31.0	.451	**.193**	.721	12.1°	2.8	**1.8**	**.7**	3.1	**16.4**
**Career**	3 years, 2 teams	107	107	31.6	.434	.189	.735	12.6‡	2.7	1.5	.6	3.0	15.0
**Career**	All-Star	3	0	14.8	.444	.000	1.000	8.3	2.0	.7	.3	.3	6.0

==== Playoffs ====
WNBA playoff statistics
Year	Team	GP	GS	MPG	FG%	3P%	FT%	RPG	APG	SPG	BPG	TO	PPG
2026	Atlanta	12	12	33.8	.417	.379	.778	11.0°	2.6	1.4	1.7	3.2	16.1
**Career**	1 year, 1 team	12	12	33.8	.417	.379	.778	11.0	2.6	1.4	1.7	3.2	16.1

=== College ===
NCAA statistics
Year	Team	GP	GS	MPG	FG%	3P%	FT%	RPG	APG	SPG	BPG	TO	PPG
2020–21	Maryland	15	4	15.1	.467	.167	.671	6.0	1.1	0.6	1.3	**1.5**	10.0
2021–22	Maryland	32	31	25.9	.500	**.182**	.683	10.6	1.5	1.7	1.1	2.5	17.8
2022–23*	LSU	**36**	**36**	**33.6**	**.525**	.167	.708	**15.4**	**2.3**	1.8	**1.6**	2.2	**23.0**
2023–24	LSU	33	33	31.4	.471	.111	**.726**	13.4	**2.3**	**1.9**	1.0	2.4	18.6
**Career**		116	104	28.5	.498	.156	.704	12.3	1.9	1.6	1.2	2.3	18.6

== Off the court ==
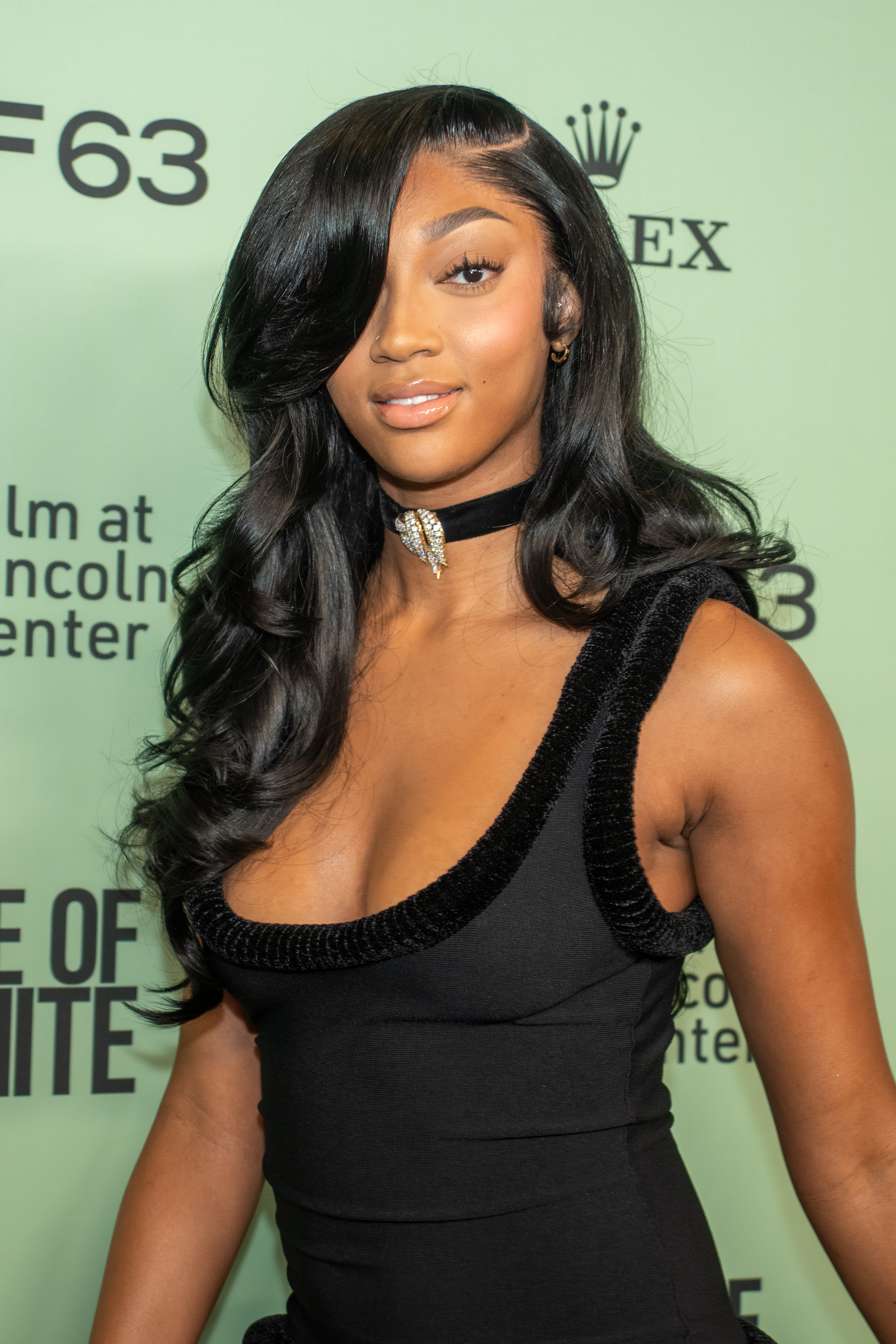
Reese at the 2025 New York Film Festival for the film A House of Dynamite in which she played herself

=== Personal life ===
Reese's mother, Angel Reese (née Webb), played college basketball for UMBC, where she was inducted into the Athletics Hall of Fame and her number 10 jersey was retired. She later played professionally in Luxembourg. Reese's father, Michael Reese, with whom she does not have a close relationship, played basketball for Boston College and Loyola (Maryland) before embarking on a professional career in Luxembourg, Cyprus, Austria and Portugal. Reese was raised by her mother and maternal grandparents, Curtis and Barbara Webb. Her younger brother, Julian Reese, plays in the NBA and played college basketball for Maryland. Reese's stepbrother, Mikael Hopkins, is a professional basketball player. Her cousin, Jordan Hawkins, plays in the NBA and helped the UConn Huskies men's team win the 2023 NCAA championship.

Reese majored in interdisciplinary studies at Louisiana State University and majored in communications at the University of Maryland, College Park. She graduated LSU with a degree in Interdisciplinary Studies with concentrations and minors in Communication Studies, Leadership Development and Psychology. She has expressed interest in broadcasting and modeling after her basketball career. She was a member of the honor roll in high school.

=== Business interests ===
Reese is represented by agent Jeanine Ogbonnaya of the Clearview Group, who has worked with her since Reese played for Maryland. She is signed with The Society Management for managing her fashion endeavors. Reese was estimated to be one of the highest-earning college athletes from name, image, and likeness (NIL) deals. After her junior season, she surpassed $1 million in NIL valuation, leading all women's college basketball players, according to college sports website On3. On October 17, 2023, she signed an endorsement deal with Reebok; she was drawn to the company by its new president of basketball, Shaquille O'Neal, and was its first signing since O'Neal moved into the role. Reese has also signed deals with Amazon, Bose, Coach, Discord, Outback Steakhouse, Sonic, TurboTax, Wingstop and Xfinity, among other companies. Due to her success with NIL, Reese was featured alongside LSU gymnast and leading NIL figure Livvy Dunne on the October 2023 cover of the Sports Illustrated Money Issue, titled "Generation NIL". She became a part owner of the USL Super League professional soccer team DC Power FC in May 2024.

Reese has established a large social media following, which grew rapidly after her junior season in college. She entered the 2023 NCAA tournament with 447,000 Instagram followers and surpassed 1 million followers by the end of the tournament. In the following month, Reese reached 2 million followers on the platform. By January 2025, she gained 4.6 million followers, making her the most followed player in the WNBA.

Reese was nicknamed the "Bayou Barbie" after transferring to LSU. The nickname refers to the location of the school, in Baton Rouge, Louisiana, and her appearance on the court, with eyelash extensions and long pink nails. She credits a fan in Baton Rouge with creating the nickname, and she filed for a trademark on the "Bayou Barbie" in her first season at LSU but was denied. With the Chicago Sky, she has been nicknamed the "Chi-Town Barbie" or the "Chi Barbie."

In August 2024, Reese signed a sponsorship deal with the Hershey's chocolate and candy brand Reese's. Her fans use the nickname Reese's Pieces. The sponsorship agreement includes an apparel collection. The next month, Reese started a podcast called Unapologetically Angel on the Playmaker network.

In February 2025, Reese collaborated with McDonald's on a special meal named after her that launched on February 10. The Angel Reese Special consists of a quarter pounder with cheese, bacon, and barbecue sauce, as well as medium fries and a medium soft drink. Reese is the first female athlete that McDonald's has named a meal after. Reese and Reebok debuted Reese's first signature basketball shoe, the "Angel Reese 1", on July 9, 2025, which were released in September. That same month, Reese joined the ownership group of Togethxr, along with Sue Bird, Alex Morgan, Simone Manuel, and Chloe Kim. Reese said the company is "about changing the way women in sports are seen and celebrated."

=== Philanthropy ===
Reese announced the launch of the Angel C. Reese Foundation in July 2023, which aims to empower girls through sports, education, and financial literacy. In August 2023, the Reese foundation hosted the "Back-to-School Giveback Block Party", to provide school supplies to students. Reese made a $12,000 donation to the Joan & Bert Hash Fund to cover tuition expenses for a member of the St. Frances Academy girls basketball team.

In October 2024, the Reese foundation and digital wallet service, Cash App, announced a partnership to promote financial literacy, with Reese leading Cash App's “That's Money” campaign. The foundation also announced the renovation of a community basketball court in Baton Rouge, Louisiana.

On May 6, 2025, the Foundation and Magic Johnson announced the Wealth Playbook partnership, aimed at improving financial literacy for youth.

=== In popular culture ===
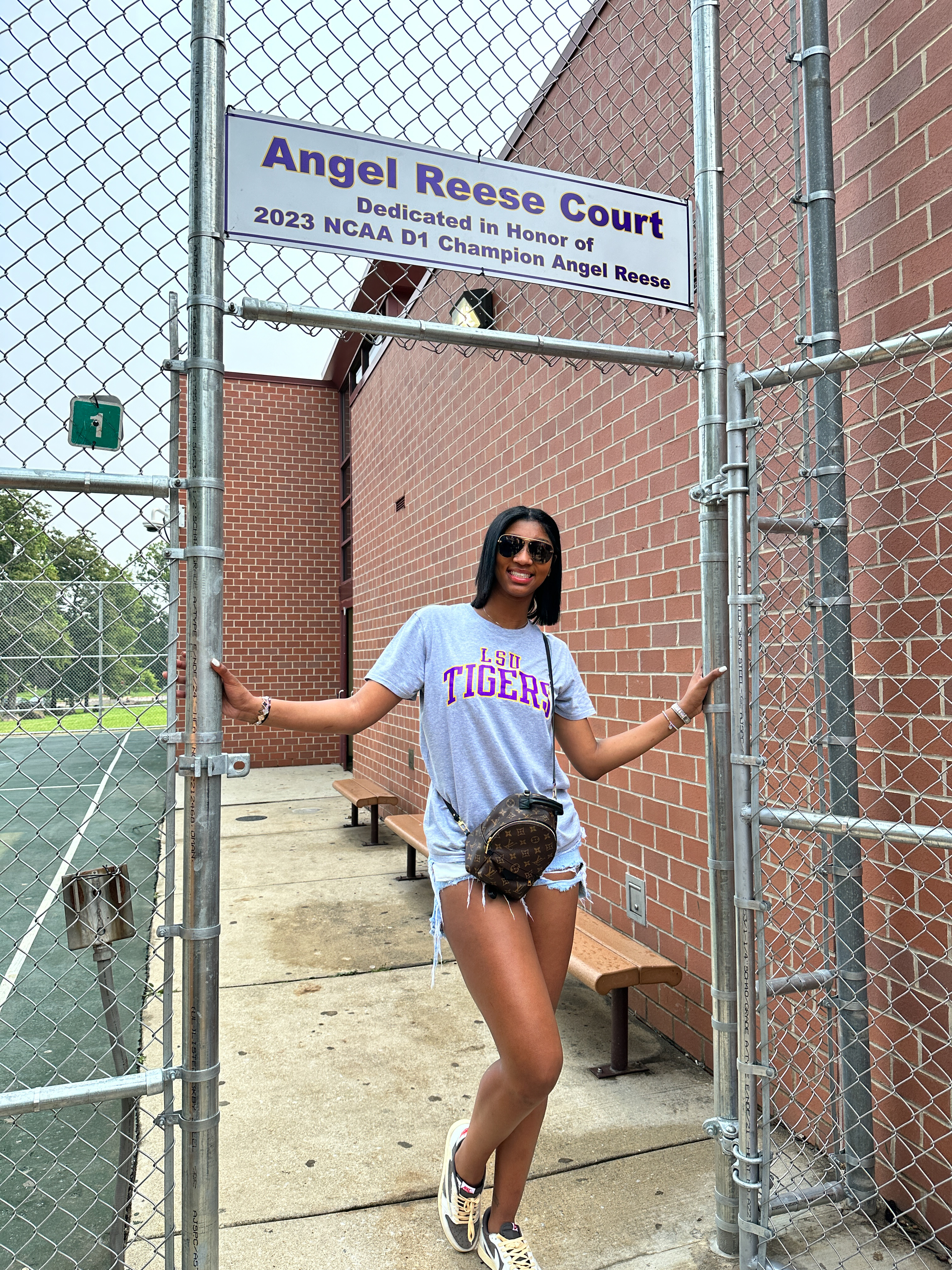
Reese at the Angel Reese Court in Randallstown, Maryland during its ribbon-cutting ceremony in 2023

Reese was portrayed by comedian Punkie Johnson on the April 8, 2023, episode of Saturday Night Live. Johnson's skit parodied Reese's gesture at the end of the 2023 NCAA Division I championship game and her dispute over Jill Biden's comments about inviting Iowa to the White House.

In 2023, Reese was included in the Time 100 Next list, which recognizes emerging leaders from around the world. She was featured in the 2023 edition of the Sports Illustrated Swimsuit Issue as part of the magazine's efforts to empower women. In the same year, Reese appeared in the Harper's Bazaar Icons Issue, which highlights 14 people inspiring cultural change. She was included in the Forbes 30 Under 30 sports list for 2024.

Reese made a cameo in the music video for "Put It on da Floor Again" by Latto and Cardi B, released on June 2, 2023. In the song, Cardi B says "I been ballin' so damn hard, could've went to LSU." She was featured on The Money Game: LSU, a six-part NIL-focused docuseries by Prime Video that followed her, Jayden Daniels, Flau'jae Johnson, Livvy Dunne, Alia Armstrong, and Trace Young through LSU's 2023–24 sports season. The series was nominated for Outstanding Documentary Series (Serialized) at the 46th Sports Emmy Awards.

On July 17, 2023, the newly renovated basketball court at the Scotts Branch Recreation Activity Center in Reese's hometown of Randallstown, Maryland, was named the Angel Reese Court. Later that week, she threw out the first pitch at a Baltimore Orioles game and was presented with the key to the city of Baltimore from Mayor Brandon Scott. Reese attended the annual Met Gala in New York City on May 6, 2024, and was one of several star athletes announced as a member of the 2025 Met Gala host committee.

In January 2025, Reese featured as the cover star for Vogue magazine's winter issue, profiling the convergence of sports and fashion in her career. In July 2025, Reese was named the co-cover athlete for the Leave No Doubt edition (alongside Shai Gilgeous-Alexander and Carmelo Anthony), and solo cover athlete for the WNBA edition of NBA 2K26, a popular video game, making Reese the second WNBA player after A'ja Wilson to be featured on a cover of a global edition of the game. Reese walked in the Victoria's Secret Fashion Show in October 2025, becoming the first professional athlete to walk in the show.

During the 2026 WNBA All-Star Weekend, Mattel and Reese unveiled a signature Barbie doll in her likeness, making her only the second WNBA player after Sue Bird to receive one, along with a Barbie-themed colorway for her line of basketball shoes.

== Filmography ==
List of television shows and films, showing year aired, character played, and notes
Year	Feature	Role	Notes	Ref.
2024	The Money Game: LSU	Herself	Main role (Season 1 –present)	
2025	A House of Dynamite	Herself	Guest appearance	
2026	Goat	Propp / Dawson	Voice	
2026	The Hunting Wives	Trainer Barbie	Season 2	

== See also ==
- List of WNBA annual rebounding leaders
- List of WNBA regular season records
