= List of WNBA annual rebounding leaders =

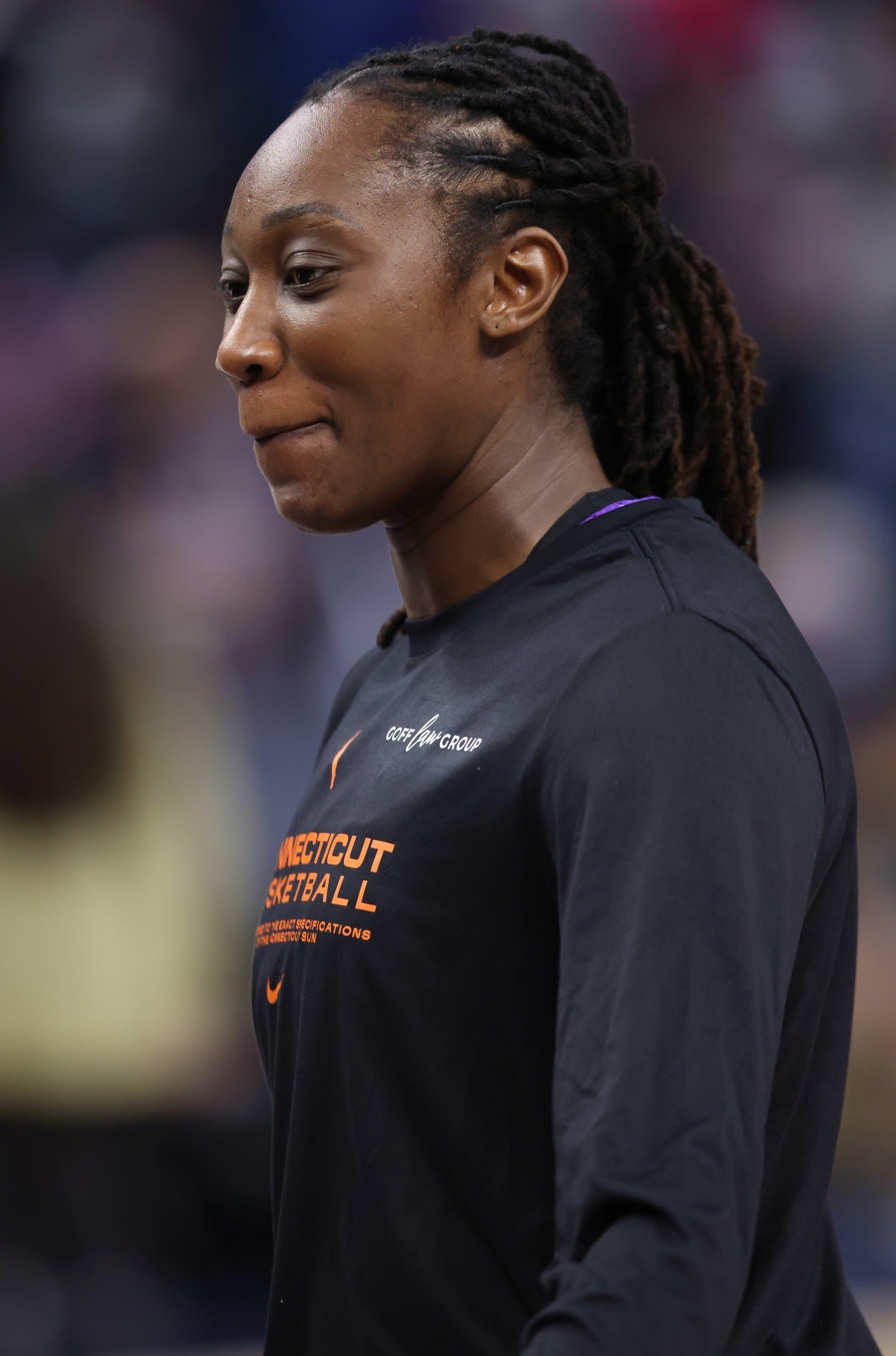
Tina Charles won a record 4 rebounding titles in her career.

In basketball, a rebound is the act of gaining possession of the ball after a missed field goal or free throw. An offensive rebound occurs when a player recovers the ball after their own or a teammate's missed shot attempt, while a defensive rebound occurs when a player recovers the ball after an opponent's missed shot attempt. The Women's National Basketball Association's (WNBA) rebounding leader is the player with the highest rebounds per game average in a given season.

Angel Reese holds the all-time records for rebounds per game in a single season (13.12) which was achieved in the 2024 season, total rebounds (521) and offensive rebounds (206) which were both achieved in the 2026 season.

Tina Charles holds the most rebounding titles in her career, with four. Sylvia Fowles, Jonquel Jones, Lisa Leslie, Candace Parker and Angel Reese each won three rebounding titles while Cheryl Ford, Yolanda Griffith, Chamique Holdsclaw, Courtney Paris, each won two rebounding titles. Tina Charles and Angel Reese each hold the record for consecutive seasons leading the league in rebounding, doing so three times with Tina Charles leading in the 2010 season, 2011 season, 2012 season and Angel Reese leading in the 2024 season, 2025 season, 2026 season. Other players to have led the league in rebounding in consecutive seasons include Lisa Leslie in the 1997 season, 1998 season, Candace Parker in the 2008 season, 2009 season, Cheryl Ford in the 2005 season, 2006 season, Chamique Holdsclaw in the 2002 season, 2003 season, Courtney Paris in the 2014 season, 2015 season.

== Key ==
^		Active WNBA player			
*		Inducted into the Naismith Memorial Basketball Hall of Fame			
†		Not yet eligible for Hall of Fame consideration (Note: A player is not eligible for induction into the Naismith Memorial Basketball Hall of Fame until the player has been fully retired for two calendar years.)			
§		1st time eligible for Hall of Fame in 2025			
‡		Denotes player who won the Most Valuable Player award that year			
Player (X)		Denotes the number of times the player had been the rebounding leader up to and including that season			
G	Guard	F	Forward	C	Center

== Annual leaders ==
Season	Player	Pos.	Team	Games played	Offensive rebounds	Defensive rebounds	Total rebounds	RPG
1997	Lisa Leslie*	C	Los Angeles Sparks	28	63	203	266	9.50
1998	Lisa Leslie* (2)	C	Los Angeles Sparks	28	77	208	285	10.18
1999 ‡	Yolanda Griffith*	C	Sacramento Monarchs	29	141	188	329	11.34
2000	Natalie Williams	C	Utah Starzz	29	132	204	336	11.59
2001	Yolanda Griffith* (2)	C	Sacramento Monarchs	32	162	195	357	11.16
2002	Chamique Holdsclaw*	F	Washington Mystics	20	54	178	232	11.60
2003	Chamique Holdsclaw* (2)	F	Washington Mystics	27	72	222	294	10.89
2004 ‡	Lisa Leslie* (3)	C	Los Angeles Sparks	34	60	276	336	9.88
2005	Cheryl Ford	F	Detroit Shock	33	113	209	322	9.76
2006	Cheryl Ford (2)	F	Detroit Shock	32	130	233	363	11.34
2007 ‡	Lauren Jackson*	F/C	Seattle Storm	31	80	220	300	9.68
2008 ‡	Candace Parker*	F/C	Los Angeles Sparks	33	84	229	313	9.48
2009	Candace Parker* (2)	F/C	Los Angeles Sparks	25	60	184	244	9.76
2010	Tina Charles†	C	Connecticut Sun	34	129	269	398	11.71
2011	Tina Charles† (2)	C	Connecticut Sun	34	126	248	374	11.00
2012 ‡	Tina Charles† (3)	C	Connecticut Sun	33	123	222	345	10.45
2013	Sylvia Fowles*	C	Chicago Sky	32	117	252	369	11.53
2014	Courtney Paris	C	Tulsa Shock	34	136	211	347	10.21
2015	Courtney Paris (2)	C	Tulsa Shock	34	102	215	317	9.32
2016	Tina Charles† (4)	C	New York Liberty	32	74	243	317	9.91
2017	Jonquel Jones^	C	Connecticut Sun	34	123	280	403	11.85
2018	Sylvia Fowles* (2)	C	Minnesota Lynx	34	122	282	404	11.88
2019	Jonquel Jones^ (2)	C	Connecticut Sun	34	113	217	330	9.71
2020	Candace Parker* (3)	F/C	Los Angeles Sparks	22	37	177	214	9.73
2021 ‡	Jonquel Jones^ (3)	C	Connecticut Sun	27	67	236	303	11.22
2022	Sylvia Fowles* (3)	C	Minnesota Lynx	30	74	220	294	9.80
2023	Alyssa Thomas^	F	Connecticut Sun	40	80	314	394	9.85
2024	Angel Reese^	F	Chicago Sky	34	172	274	446	13.12
2025	Angel Reese^ (2)	F	Chicago Sky	30	123	254	377	12.57
2026	Angel Reese^ (3)	F	Atlanta Dream	43	206	315	521	12.12

== Multiple-time leaders ==
Rank	Player	Team	Times leader	Years
1	Tina Charles	Connecticut Sun (3) / New York Liberty (1)	4	2010, 2011, 2012, 2016
2	Sylvia Fowles	Chicago Sky (1) / Minnesota Lynx (2)	3	2013, 2018, 2022
2	Jonquel Jones	Connecticut Sun	3	2017, 2019, 2021
2	Lisa Leslie	Los Angeles Sparks	3	1997, 1998, 2004
2	Candace Parker	Los Angeles Sparks	3	2008, 2009, 2020
2	Angel Reese	Chicago Sky (2) / Atlanta Dream (1)	3	2024, 2025, 2026
6	Cheryl Ford	Detroit Shock	2	2005, 2006
6	Yolanda Griffith	Sacramento Monarchs	2	1999, 2001
6	Chamique Holdsclaw	Washington Mystics	2	2002, 2003
6	Courtney Paris	Tulsa Shock	2	2014, 2015

== See also ==
- WNBA Peak Performers
