= Unapologetically Angel =

2024 American podcast

Unapologetically Angel is a podcast hosted by WNBA player Angel Reese. Topics discussed on the podcast connect sports with the personal lives of Reese and her guests.

== History ==
On September 5, 2024, the first episode premiered on YouTube and the Playmaker network. New podcast episodes are released every Thursday in autumn and winter.

Producer, journalist, and reporter Maya Reese (no relation) co-hosts the podcast.

In the modern era of media, podcasts provide a platform for athletes to craft their own image by speaking directly to fans.

== Guests ==
Reese invites a guest for an episode and interviews them. Famous guests include Latto, GloRilla, Ciara, Sexyy Red, and Olandria Carthen.

== Awards ==
Unapologetically Angel was named one of the "Best New Shows" by Spotify.
