= 2024 United States women's Olympic basketball team =

- Head coach: Cheryl Reeve

The 2024 United States women's Olympic basketball team competed in the Games of the XXXIII Olympiad held in Paris, France. Led by coach Cheryl Reeve, the team won its tenth gold medal, and eighth consecutive, at the event.

== Roster ==
United States women's national basketball team – 2024 Summer Olympics roster
Players
Coaches

Pos.	No.	Name	Age – Date of birth	Height	Club	Ctr.
G	4	Jewell Loyd	30 – October 5, 1993	5 ft 10 in (1.78 m)	Seattle Storm	(United States)
G	5	Kelsey Plum	29 – August 24, 1994	5 ft 8 in (1.73 m)	Las Vegas Aces	(United States)
G	6	Sabrina Ionescu	26 – December 6, 1997	5 ft 11 in (1.8 m)	New York Liberty	(United States)
G/F	7	Kahleah Copper	29 – August 24, 1994	6 ft 1 in (1.85 m)	Phoenix Mercury	(United States)
G	8	Chelsea Gray	31 – October 8, 1992	5 ft 11 in (1.8 m)	Las Vegas Aces	(United States)
F	9	A'ja Wilson	27 – August 8, 1996	6 ft 5 in (1.96 m)	Las Vegas Aces	(United States)
F	10	Breanna Stewart	29 – August 27, 1994	6 ft 5 in (1.96 m)	New York Liberty	(United States)
F	11	Napheesa Collier	27 – September 23, 1996	6 ft 1 in (1.85 m)	Minnesota Lynx	(United States)
G	12	Diana Taurasi	42 – June 11, 1982	6 ft 0 in (1.83 m)	Phoenix Mercury	(United States)
G	13	Jackie Young	26 – September 16, 1997	6 ft 0 in (1.83 m)	Las Vegas Aces	(United States)
F	14	Alyssa Thomas	32 – April 12, 1992	6 ft 2 in (1.88 m)	Connecticut Sun	(United States)
C	15	Brittney Griner	33 – October 18, 1990	6 ft 9 in (2.06 m)	Phoenix Mercury	(United States)

Head coach

- (United States) Cheryl Reeve

Assistant coach(es)

- (United States) Mike Thibault
- (United States) Kara Lawson
- (United States) Joni Taylor

Legend

- Club – describes last
  club before the tournament
- Age – describes age
  in July 2024

== Results ==
=== Group stage ===
29 July 2024
21:00

Boxscore

United States	102–76	Japan
Scoring by quarter: 22–15, 28–24, 29–18, 23–19
Pts: Wilson 24; Rebs: Wilson 13; Asts: Gray 13		Pts: Takada 24; Rebs: four players 3 Asts: Machida, Yamamoto 5

Stade Pierre-Mauroy, Lille
Attendance: 13,040
Referees: Luis Castillo (ESP), Viola Györgyi (NOR), Yevgeniy Mikheyev (KAZ)

1 August 2024
21:00

Boxscore

Belgium	74–87	United States
Scoring by quarter: 23–23, 15–23, 15–14, 21–27
Pts: Meesseman 24; Rebs: Delaere, Linskens 5 Asts: Delaere 8		Pts: Stewart 26; Rebs: Wilson 13; Asts: Ionescu 5

Stade Pierre-Mauroy, Lille
Attendance: 25,044
Referees: Wojciech Liszka (POL), Luis Castillo (ESP), Ariadna Chueca (ESP)

4 August 2024
17:15

Boxscore

Germany	68–87	United States
Scoring by quarter: 19–16, 10–25, 17–28, 22–18
Pts: S. Sabally 15; Rebs: Geiselsöder 8 Asts: Peterson 4		Pts: Young 19; Rebs: Collier 7 Asts: three players 5

Stade Pierre-Mauroy, Lille
Attendance: 25,844
Referees: Julio Anaya (PAN), Gatis Saliņš (LAT), Viola Györgyi (NOR)

=== Quarterfinal ===
7 August 2024
21:30

Boxscore

Nigeria	74–88	United States
Scoring by quarter: 17–26, 16–26, 15–24, 26–12
Pts: Amukamara 19; Rebs: Kunaiyi-Akpannah 8 Asts: Kalu 7		Pts: Wilson 20; Rebs: Wilson 11; Asts: Thomas 6

Accor Arena, Paris
Attendance: 12,437
Referees: Viola Györgyi (NOR), Juan Fernández (ARG), Yann Davidson (MAD)

=== Semifinal ===
9 August 2024
17:30

Boxscore

United States	85–64	Australia
Scoring by quarter: 20–16, 25–11, 21–13, 19–24
Pts: Young 14; Rebs: Wilson 8 Asts: three players 5		Pts: Borlase 11; Rebs: Smith 7 Asts: three players 3

Accor Arena, Paris
Attendance: 11,919
Referees: Gatis Saliņš (LAT), Viola Györgyi (NOR), Péter Praksch (HUN)

=== Gold Medal final ===
11 August 2024
15:30

Boxscore

France	66–67	United States
Scoring by quarter: 9–15, 16–10, 18–20, 23–22
Pts: Williams 19; Rebs: Williams 7 Asts: Badiane 3		Pts: Wilson 21; Rebs: Wilson 13; Asts: Gray, Plum 4

Accor Arena, Paris
Attendance: 12,126
Referees: Boris Krejić (SLO), Viola Györgyi (NOR), Martin Vulić (CRO)

== See also ==
- 2024 Summer Olympics
- Basketball at the 2024 Summer Olympics
- United States at the 2024 Summer Olympics
- United States women's national basketball team
