= 2025–26 EuroCup Women regular season =

EuroCup Women regular season
- Season: 2025–26
- Dates: 8 October – 27 November 2025
- Games played: 144
- Teams: 48 (from 21 countries)

The 2025–26 EuroCup Women regular season was played between the 8 October to 27 November 2025.

== Format ==
- Regular season

After the qualifiers, 48 teams are divided into 12 groups of 4. The groups are held in a double home and away format. The top 2 plus the 4 best third place teams advancing to the knockout stage.

== Draw ==
External videos
- Draw

The seeding was announced on 17 July 2025. The draw took place at 10:00 CET in Munich, Germany on 23 July 2025. Only a maximum of one club from the same country can be in the same regular season group. The seeding is based on the club rankings.

Key to colours
Teams advancing to the Knockout stage

Pot 1
Team	Rank	Points
(Czech Republic) Žabiny Brno (Note: Team not known at the time of the draw. Was the Play Off 1 Loser in EuroLeague Women qualification.)	27	32
(Serbia) KKZ Crvena zvezda (Note: Team not known at the time of the draw. Was the Play Off 3 Loser in EuroLeague Women qualification.)	49	18
(Romania) ACS Sepsi SIC (Note: Team not known at the time of the draw. Was the Play Off 4 Loser in EuroLeague Women qualification.)	27	32
(Poland) AZS UMCS Lublin (Note: Team not known at the time of the draw. Was the Play Off 4 Loser in EuroLeague Women qualification.)	35	28
(Lithuania) Kibirkštis-TOKS (Note: Team not known at the time of the draw. Was the Play Off 5 Loser in EuroLeague Women qualification.)	39	24
(France) Villeneuve-d'Ascq LM	5	164
(Spain) Perfumerías Avenida	7	104
(France) BLMA	17	50
(Turkey) Beşiktaş Boa	17	50
(France) UFAB 49	22	42
(Hungary) NKA Universitas PEAC	24	34
(Spain) Baxi Ferrol	29	30

Pot 2
Team	Rank	Points
(Spain) Movistar Estudiantes	29	30
(Poland) Enea Gorzow (Note: Later renamed KSSSE Enea AZS AJP Gorzów after the draw.)	29	30
(Israel) Elitzur Ramla	29	30
(Belgium) Castors Braine	35	28
(Belgium) Kangoeroes Basket Mechelen	38	26
(Germany) Rutronik Stars Keltern	39	44
(Latvia) TTT Riga	39	44
(Switzerland) BCF Elfic Fribourg	42	22
(Czech Republic) KP Brno	43	20
(Belgium) Basket Namur Capitale	43	20
(Greece) Panathinaikos AC	43	20
(Portugal) SL Benfica	43	20

Pot 3
Team	Rank	Points
(Poland) MB Zagłębie Sosnowiec	49	18
(Slovakia) Piešťanské Čajky	49	18
(Czech Republic) Levhartice Chomutov	58	10
(Spain) Hozono Global Jairis	58	10
(France) Charnay Basket	58	10
(Italy) Magnolia Basket Campobasso	58	10
(Italy) GEAS Basket	58	10
(Lithuania) BC Neptūnas-Amberton	58	10
(Croatia) ŽKK Ragusa	66	8
(Portugal) Sportiva/AzorisHotels	66	8
(Bulgaria) Beroe Stara Zagora	79	4
(Turkey) Emlak Konut SK	79	4

Pot 4
Team	Rank	Points
(Poland) Ślęza Wrocław	N/A	
(Greece) Athinaikos Qualco	N/A	
(Romania) CS Rapid București	N/A	
(Germany) Saarlouis Royals	N/A	
(Switzerland) Nyon Basket Feminin	N/A	
(Croatia) ŽKK Trešnjevka 2009 (Note: Later renamed WBC Trešnjevka Dinamo LTD after the draw.)	N/A	
(Kosovo) KBF Peja 03	N/A	
(Serbia) UZKK Student (Note: Team not known at the time of the draw. Was the Play Off 1 Winner in EuroCup Women qualification.)	N/A	
(Spain) Lointek Gernika Bizkaia (Note: Team not known at the time of the draw. Was the Play Off 2 Winner in EuroCup Women qualification.)	49	18
(Italy) BDS Dinamo Sassari (Note: Team not known at the time of the draw. Was the Play Off 3 Winner in EuroCup Women qualification.)	23	38
(Czech Republic) SBŠ Ostrava (Note: Team not known at the time of the draw. Was the Play Off 4 Winner in EuroCup Women qualification.)	93	2
(Hungary) TARR KSC Szekszárd (Note: Team not known at the time of the draw. Was the Play Off 5 Winner in EuroCup Women qualification.)	24	34

== Groups ==
=== Group A ===
Pos	Team	Pld	W	L	PF	PA	PD	Pts	Qualification	MAG	ZAB	CAS	TRE
1	(Italy) Magnolia Basket Campobasso	6	4	2	451	346	+105	10 (Note: Magnolia Basket Campobasso 2–2, +27 PD; Žabiny Brno 2–2, +12 PD; Castors Braine 2–2, −39 PD)	Play-off Round 1	—	54–76	86–59	76–50
2	(Czech Republic) Žabiny Brno	6	4	2	456	387	+69	10	Play-off Round 1	71–67	—	65–71	83–58
3	(Belgium) Castors Braine	6	4	2	443	397	+46	10	Play-off Round 1	46–72	80–72	—	110–43
4	(Croatia) WBC Trešnjevka Dinamo LTD	6	0	6	311	531	−220	6		44–96	57–89	59–77	—

Source: EuroCup Women
Rules for classification: 1) Points; 2) Points difference; 3) Points scored.
Notes:

8 October 2025
20:00

Boxscore

Castors Braine (Belgium)	80–72	(Czech Republic) Žabiny Brno
Scoring by quarter: 23–19, 19–24, 18–17, 20–12
Pts: Gaston 23; Rebs: Miller 9 Asts: Miller 5		Pts: Wadoux 14; Rebs: Spanou 8 Asts: Hamzová 6

Stade Gaston Reiff, Braine-l'Alleud
Attendance: 600
Referees: Iain Macdonald (GBR), Martin Demierre (SUI), Lauri Jäämaa (FIN)

9 October 2025
18:00

Boxscore

WBC Trešnjevka Dinamo LTD (Croatia)	44–96	(Italy) Magnolia Basket Campobasso
Scoring by quarter: 15–19, 13–29, 10–28, 6–20
Pts: Novak 13; Rebs: Vojtulek 13; Asts: Novak, Vojtulek 3		Pts: Giacchetti 26; Rebs: Madera 6 Asts: Miccoli 5

Dražen Petrović Basketball Hall, Zagreb
Attendance: 300
Referees: Aleksandar Radonjic (AUT), László Goda (HUN), Azra Mušić (SLO)

15 October 2025
18:00

Boxscore

Žabiny Brno (Czech Republic)	83–58	(Croatia) WBC Trešnjevka Dinamo LTD
Scoring by quarter: 17–18, 23–12, 27–15, 16–13
Pts: Spanou 21; Rebs: Spanou 11; Asts: Záplatová 8		Pts: Vojtulek 19; Rebs: Vojtulek 13; Asts: Rodek 5

Rosnička Gym, Brno
Attendance: 637
Referees: Peter Zenis (SVK), Diana Lapanović (SLO), Romana Rea Car (AUT)

15 October 2025
20:00

Boxscore

Castors Braine (Belgium)	46–72	(Italy) Magnolia Basket Campobasso
Scoring by quarter: 11–18, 10–18, 13–18, 12–18
Pts: Gaston, Miller 10; Rebs: Miller 13; Asts: Vervaet 2		Pts: Mukurat 14; Rebs: Gray 11; Asts: Trimboli 5

Stade Gaston Reiff, Braine-l'Alleud
Attendance: 986
Referees: Jamie Dooley (IRL), Hande Ozturk (LUX), José Pedroso (POR)

22 October 2025
20:00

Boxscore

WBC Trešnjevka Dinamo LTD (Croatia)	59–77	(Belgium) Castors Braine
Scoring by quarter: 13–26, 15–10, 24–17, 7–24
Pts: Novak 12; Rebs: Heljic 8 Asts: Curic 4		Pts: Miller 23; Rebs: Gaston 12; Asts: three players 6

Dražen Petrović Basketball Hall, Zagreb
Attendance: 150
Referees: Rúben Györfy (HUN), Marton Makrai (HUN), Hasan Bajgoric (BIH)

22 October 2025
20:30

Boxscore

Magnolia Basket Campobasso (Italy)	54–76	(Czech Republic) Žabiny Brno
Scoring by quarter: 9–15, 15–19, 17–18, 13–24
Pts: Madera 18; Rebs: Madera 11; Asts: Makurat 3		Pts: Wadoux 20; Rebs: Spanou 12; Asts: Zeithammerova 11

La Molisana Arena, Campobasso
Referees: Edison Gjoni (ALB), Sandra Sanchez (ESP), Kyriacos Christou (CYP)

29 October 2025
18:00

Boxscore

Žabiny Brno (Czech Republic)	65–71	(Belgium) Castors Braine
Scoring by quarter: 17–13, 13–18, 19–22, 16–18
Pts: Spanou 15; Rebs: Spanou 12; Asts: Zeithammerova 5		Pts: Courthiau, Gaston 20; Rebs: Gaston 9 Asts: Carpreaux 8

Rosnička Gym, Brno
Attendance: 659
Referees: László Goda (HUN), Stefan Stefanov (BUL), Montis Rozenfelds (LAT)

29 October 2025
20:30

Boxscore

Magnolia Basket Campobasso (Italy)	76–50	(Croatia) WBC Trešnjevka Dinamo LTD
Scoring by quarter: 21–12, 21–11, 9–12, 25–15
Pts: three players 11; Rebs: Gray 8 Asts: Simon 6		Pts: Novak 11; Rebs: Vojtulek 9 Asts: Rodek 5

La Molisana Arena, Campobasso
Attendance: 643
Referees: Raul Zamorano Sanchez (ESP), Martin Demierre (SUI) AKKUSOGLU, Tolga Akkusoglu (TUR)

5 November 2025
20:00

Boxscore

WBC Trešnjevka Dinamo LTD (Croatia)	57–89	(Czech Republic) Žabiny Brno
Scoring by quarter: 15–28, 11–19, 14–23, 17–19
Pts: Novak 22; Rebs: Vojtulek 9 Asts: Curic, Vojtulek 3		Pts: Zaplatova 20; Rebs: Zahui B. 10; Asts: Wadoux 11

Dražen Petrović Basketball Hall, Zagreb
Attendance: 150
Referees: Alija Ferevski (MKD), Stefan Vukovic (MNE), Elldin Uglari (KOS)

5 November 2025
20:30

Boxscore

Magnolia Basket Campobasso (Italy)	86–59	(Belgium) Castors Braine
Scoring by quarter: 24–13, 26–18, 25–17, 11–11
Pts: Madera, Meldere 15; Rebs: Makurat 6 Asts: Simon 5		Pts: Courthiau 20; Rebs: Kapenga 9 Asts: Carpreaux 4

La Molisana Arena, Campobasso
Attendance: 567
Referees: Primož Pipan (SLO), Gregor Oprčkal (SLO), Pantelis Vasiliou (CYP)

25 November 2025
19:00

Boxscore

Žabiny Brno (Czech Republic)	71–67	(Italy) Magnolia Basket Campobasso
Scoring by quarter: 29–24, 13–11, 16–24, 13–8
Pts: Spanou 16; Rebs: Spanou 9 Asts: Zaplatova 4		Pts: Makurat 22; Rebs: Gray 14; Asts: Morrison 6

Rosnička Gym, Brno
Attendance: 728
Referees: Natasa Dragokevic (MNE), Roko Hordov (CRO), Amalia Marchiş (ROU)

26 November 2025
20:00

Boxscore

Castors Braine (Belgium)	110–43	(Croatia) WBC Trešnjevka Dinamo LTD
Scoring by quarter: 31–13, 20–8, 30–10, 29–12
Pts: Ivanova 22; Rebs: Gaston 10; Asts: Carpreaux 7		Pts: Vojtulek 12; Rebs: Vojtulek 6 Asts: Heljic 3

Stade Gaston Reiff, Braine-l'Alleud
Attendance: 1,155
Referees: Oleksandr Dotsenko (LUX), Milita Stalaucinskaite (LTU), Silvia Jury (AUT)

=== Group B ===
Pos	Team	Pld	W	L	PF	PA	PD	Pts	Qualification	LUB	JAI	STU	NAM
1	(Poland) LOTTO AZS UMCS Lublin	6	5	1	456	379	+77	11	Play-off Round 1	—	75–61	86–62	86–62
2	(Spain) Hozono Global Jairis	6	4	2	441	364	+77	10	Play-off Round 1	64–58	—	99–62	53–62
3	(Serbia) UŽKK Student	6	2	4	410	501	−91	8		73–86	62–84	—	71–69
4	(Belgium) Basket Namur Capitale	6	1	5	372	435	−63	7		57–65	45–80	77–80	—

Source: EuroCup Women
Rules for classification: 1) Points; 2) Points difference; 3) Points scored.

9 October 2025
19:00

Boxscore

UŽKK Student (Serbia)	62–84	(Spain) Hozono Global Jairis
Scoring by quarter: 20–27, 14–13, 16–27, 12–17
Pts: Briggs 12; Rebs: Nedeljkov 5 Asts: Marjanović 5		Pts: Massey 17; Rebs: Massey 11; Asts: Ayuso 8

Čair Sports Center, Niš
Attendance: 300
Referees: Cisil Güngör (TUR), Monika Mincheva (BUL), Eirini Margarita Tsantali (GRE)

9 October 2025
20:30

Boxscore

Basket Namur Capitale (Belgium)	57–65	(Poland) AZS UMCS Lublin
Scoring by quarter: 25–14, 8–14, 17–19, 7–18
Pts: Leblon 20; Rebs: Franquin 6 Asts: three players 3		Pts: Ullmann 19; Rebs: Gatling, Gil 11; Asts: Gil 6

Hall Octave Henry, Namur
Attendance: 1,000
Referees: Simon Unsworth (GBR), Frane Mjeda (CRO), Pierre Landy (FRA)

15 October 2025
20:30

Boxscore

Hozono Global Jairis (Spain)	53–62	(Belgium) Basket Namur Capitale
Scoring by quarter: 14–13, 15–16, 11–18, 13–15
Pts: Ayuso, Vonleh 13; Rebs: Ayuso 9 Asts: Ayuso 5		Pts: Selimovic 20; Rebs: Onyiah 7 Asts: Leblon 6

Pabellón Municipal Fausto Vicent, Spain, Alcantarilla
Attendance: 750
Referees: Josh Bowe (GBR), Oleksandr Dotsenko (LUX), Martin Kucirek (CZE)

16 October 2025
18:00

Boxscore

AZS UMCS Lublin (Poland)	86–62	(Serbia) UŽKK Student
Scoring by quarter: 30–19, 16–13, 23–16, 17–14
Pts: Ryan 16; Rebs: Adamczuk, Gil 6 Asts: Slocum 8		Pts: Nedeljkov 13; Rebs: Briggs 8 Asts: five players 3

Hala Mosir, Lublin
Attendance: 657
Referees: Petr Blahout (CZE), Jakub Izak (SVK), Eduard Uhrin (SVK)

23 October 2025
20:30

Boxscore

Basket Namur Capitale (Belgium)	77–80	(Serbia) UŽKK Student
Scoring by quarter: 22–17, 17–17, 13–18, 15–15
Pts: Leblon 16; Rebs: Onyiah 14; Asts: Selimovic 6		Pts: Vučković 21; Rebs: Vučković 10; Asts: Ćulibrk 7

Hall Octave Henry, Namur
Attendance: 1,200
Referees: Tijmen Last (NED), Hande Ozturk (LUX), Michal Scholze (CZE)

22 October 2025
20:30

Boxscore

Hozono Global Jairis (Spain)	64–58	(Poland) LOTTO AZS UMCS Lublin
Scoring by quarter: 20–12, 17–19, 13–14, 14–13
Pts: Prieto 12; Rebs: Alarcon 8 Asts: Lopez Sénéchal 4		Pts: Ryan 20; Rebs: Ryan 7 Asts: Ryan 3

Pabellón Municipal Fausto Vicent, Spain, Alcantarilla
Attendance: 812
Referees: Diogo Martins (POR), Luis Daniel Mascarenhas de Oliveira (POR), Edoardo Gonella (ITA)

29 October 2025
20:30

Boxscore

Hozono Global Jairis (Spain)	99–62	(Serbia) UŽKK Student
Scoring by quarter: 30–18, 20–20, 27–17, 22–7
Pts: Alarcon 26; Rebs: Ayuso 7 Asts: Ayuso 8		Pts: Smith 18; Rebs: Ćulibrk 5 Asts: Marjanović 2

Pabellón Municipal Fausto Vicent, Spain, Alcantarilla
Attendance: 742
Referees: José Pedroso (POR), Edoardo Gonella (ITA), Luis Daniel Mascarenhas de Oliveira (POR)

30 October 2025
18:00

Boxscore

LOTTO AZS UMCS Lublin (Poland)	86–62	(Belgium) Basket Namur Capitale
Scoring by quarter: 32–19, 20–14, 12–12, 22–17
Pts: Ullmann 17; Rebs: Ryan 7 Asts: Wojtala 8		Pts: Dossou 11; Rebs: Blackford 10; Asts: Leblon 7

Hala Mosir, Lublin
Attendance: 613
Referees: Jan Baloun (CZE), Indrė Balnionytė-Gecevičienė (LTU), Jemina Sofia Vahakytta (FIN)

5 November 2025
19:00

Boxscore

UŽKK Student (Serbia)	73–86	(Poland) LOTTO AZS UMCS Lublin
Scoring by quarter: 15–21, 23–26, 17–19, 18–20
Pts: Smith 14; Rebs: Marjanović 6 Asts: Marjanović 7		Pts: Slocum 21; Rebs: Gil 15; Asts: Gil 6

Čair Sports Center, Niš
Attendance: 200
Referees: Maria Ignatiou (CYP), Zoran Mitrovski (MKD), Monika Mincheva (BUL)

5 November 2025
20:30

Boxscore

Basket Namur Capitale (Belgium)	45–80	(Spain) Hozono Global Jairis
Scoring by quarter: 14–10, 9–27, 9–26, 13–17
Pts: Leblon 12; Rebs: Blackford 10; Asts: Defosset 4		Pts: Walker 20; Rebs: Massey 10; Asts: Ayuso 9

Hall Octave Henry, Namur
Attendance: 1.200
Referees: Emma Perry (IRL), Milita Stalaucinskaite (LTU), Jurgen Muho (LUX)

27 November 2025

Boxscore

LOTTO AZS UMCS Lublin (Poland)	75–61	(Spain) Hozono Global Jairis
Scoring by quarter: 13–15, 22–13, 25–17, 15–16
Pts: Ryan 22; Rebs: Gil 9 Asts: Slocum 7		Pts: Alarcon 13; Rebs: Massey 7 Asts: Mataix 4

Hala Mosir, Lublin
Attendance: 629
Referees: Denys Povorozniuk (UKR), Kristine Simanovica (LAT), Ognjen Mandić (SWE)

27 November 2025
17:00

Boxscore

UŽKK Student (Serbia)	71–69	(Belgium) Basket Namur Capitale
Scoring by quarter: 26–21, 21–15, 9–13, 15–20
Pts: Nedeljkov 13; Rebs: Briggs 12; Asts: Marjanović 8		Pts: Leblon 14; Rebs: Onyiah 10; Asts: Leblon 7

Čair Sports Center, Niš
Attendance: 100
Referees: Dimitar Georgiev (BUL), Andrej Zlatevski (MKD), Ivan Iliev (BUL)

=== Group C ===
Pos	Team	Pld	W	L	PF	PA	PD	Pts	Qualification	NKA	GER	RAM	SPO
1	(Hungary) NKA Universitas PEAC	6	6	0	481	335	+146	12	Play-off Round 1	—	62–60	77–61	97–59
2	(Spain) Lointek Gernika Bizkaia	6	3	3	430	366	+64	9 (Note: Lointek Gernika Bizkaia 143–129 Elitzur Ramla)	Play-off Round 1	63–66	—	62–64	82–61
3	(Israel) Elitzur Ramla	6	3	3	413	405	+8	9	Play-off Round 1	50–78	65–81	—	86–56
4	(Portugal) Sportiva/AzorisHotels	6	0	6	317	535	−218	6		42–101	48–82	51–87	—

Source: EuroCup Women
Rules for classification: 1) Points; 2) Points difference; 3) Points scored.
Notes:

8 October 2025
20:00

Boxscore

Lointek Gernika Bizkaia (Spain)	82–61	(Portugal) Sportiva/AzorisHotels
Scoring by quarter: 23–4, 19–19, 18–27, 22–11
Pts: Castedo 16; Rebs: Polleros 9 Asts: Adams 8		Pts: Nascimento 19; Rebs: Nascimento 4 Asts: Serralheiro 8

Polideportivo Maloste, Gernika
Attendance: 237
Referees: Martin van Hoye (BEL), Giacomo Dori (ITA), Gavin Williams (GBR)

14 October 2025
20:30

Boxscore

Elitzur Ramla (Israel)	86–56	(Portugal) Sportiva/AzorisHotels
Scoring by quarter: 21–16, 24–19, 20–14, 21–7
Pts: Herbert Harrigan 28; Rebs: Green 12; Asts: Herbert Harrigan 5		Pts: Nascimento 11; Rebs: Soares 13; Asts: Serralheiro 6

Pavilhão Sidónio Serpa, Ponta Delgada (Note: Due to security issues caused by the Israeli–Palestinian conflict, Eliztur Ramla cannot play their games in Israel.)
Attendance: 187
Referees: Alessandro Perciavalle (ITA), Laure Coanus (FRA), Chess van Looy (BEL)

15 October 2025
18:00

Boxscore

NKA Universitas PEAC (Hungary)	62–60	(Spain) Lointek Gernika Bizkaia
Scoring by quarter: 14–12, 16–16, 16–18, 16–14
Pts: Reisingerova 22; Rebs: Reisingerova 13; Asts: Studer 7		Pts: Castedo 15; Rebs: four players 4 Asts: Adams 6

Lauber Dezső Sports Hall, Pécs
Attendance: 800
Referees: Frane Mjeda (CRO), Luka Brekalo (BIH), Josip Mikulić (CRO)

16 October 2025
20:30

Boxscore

Sportiva/AzorisHotels (Portugal)	51–87	(Israel) Elitzur Ramla
Scoring by quarter: 15–16, 16–20, 12–28, 8–23
Pts: Gaislerova 13; Rebs: Soares 7 Asts: Serralheiro 3		Pts: Garzon 19; Rebs: Nelson 11; Asts: Nelson 5

Pavilhão Sidónio Serpa, Ponta Delgada
Attendance: 300
Referees: Alessandro Perciavalle (ITA), Laure Coanus (FRA), Chess van Looy (BEL)

25 November 2025
19:30

Boxscore

Elitzur Ramla (Israel)	65–81	(Spain) Lointek Gernika Bizkaia
Scoring by quarter: 26–16, 13–30, 8–17, 18–18
Pts: Herbert Harrigan 15; Rebs: Herbert Harrigan 7 Asts: Nelson 3		Pts: Bessoir 21; Rebs: Bessoir 9 Asts: Olaeta 7

Arena Izzi, Sofia, Bulgaria (Note: The game was played at a neutral venue after Lointek Gernika Bizkaia refused to host Elitzur Ramla for political reasons.)
Referees: Giacomo Dori (ITA), Michal Scholze (CZE), Monika Mincheva (BUL)

23 October 2025
20:30

Boxscore

Sportiva/AzorisHotels (Portugal)	42–101	(Hungary) NKA Universitas PEAC
Scoring by quarter: 17–28, 11–30, 8–25, 6–18
Pts: Rivera 13; Rebs: Soares 7 Asts: Serralheiro 3		Pts: Reisingerova 20; Rebs: Olawuyi 9 Asts: Studer 7

Pavilhão Sidónio Serpa, Ponta Delgada
Attendance: 150
Referees: Oleksandr Dotsenko (LUX), Kirsten Poffé (BEL), Jurgen Muho (LUX)

28 October 2025
18:00

Boxscore

Elitzur Ramla (Israel)	50–78	(Hungary) NKA Universitas PEAC
Scoring by quarter: 11–20, 19–24, 16–10, 4–24
Pts: Rotberg 17; Rebs: Herbert Harrigan 8 Asts: Revahe 3		Pts: Torok 17; Rebs: Torok 10; Asts: Studer 10

Lauber Dezső Sports Hall, Pécs (Note: Due to security issues caused by the Israeli–Palestinian conflict, Eliztur Ramla cannot play their games in Israel.)
Attendance: 875
Referees: Haris Bijedic (BIH), Hasan Bajgoric (BIH), Marija Ciric (SRB)

29 October 2025
20:30

Boxscore

Sportiva/AzorisHotels (Portugal)	48–82	(Spain) Lointek Gernika Bizkaia
Scoring by quarter: 7–21, 19–11, 17–20, 5–30
Pts: Paz 12; Rebs: Soares 8 Asts: Goncalves, Soares 3		Pts: Polleros 16; Rebs: Bessoir 8 Asts: Olaeta, Westerik 5

Pavilhão Sidónio Serpa, Ponta Delgada
Attendance: 150
Referees: Tijmen Last (NED), Jules Gaduel (FRA), Martin van Koye (BEL)

30 November 2025
18:00

Boxscore

NKA Universitas PEAC (Hungary)	77–61	(Israel) Elitzur Ramla
Scoring by quarter: 27–11, 24–23, 19–5, 7–22
Pts: Reisingerová 18; Rebs: Josepovits, Reisingerová 8 Asts: Rátkai 5		Pts: three players 13; Rebs: Garzon 5 Asts: Lambert 5

Lauber Dezső Sports Hall, Pécs
Attendance: 875
Referees: Danilo Petkovic (SRB), Luka Brekalo (BIH), Romana Stojanović (CRO)

5 November 2025
20:00

Boxscore

Lointek Gernika Bizkaia (Spain)	63–66	(Hungary) NKA Universitas PEAC
Scoring by quarter: 7–22, 23–16, 20–9, 13–19
Pts: Bessoir 12; Rebs: Bessoir 11; Asts: Olaeta 4		Pts: Reisingerová 23; Rebs: Reisingerová 9 Asts: Dúl 4

Polideportivo Maloste, Gernika
Attendance: 164
Referees: Julien Malane (LUX), Nicolas Rotter (GER), Doğu Berk İnnal (GER)

26 November 2025
18:00

Boxscore

NKA Universitas PEAC (Hungary)	97–59	(Portugal) Sportiva/AzorisHotels
Scoring by quarter: 17–3, 32–20, 21–22, 27–14
Pts: Dúl 15; Rebs: Rátkai, Josepovits 6 Asts: Studer 11		Pts: Nascimento 18; Rebs: Paz 8 Asts: Serralheiro, Gonçalves 3

Lauber Dezső Sports Hall, Pécs
Attendance: 800
Referees: Jelena Tomić (CRO), Marija Ćirić (SRB), Mia Maesano Krapinec (CRO)

27 November 2025
19:30

Boxscore

Lointek Gernika Bizkaia (Spain)	62–64	(Israel) Elitzur Ramla
Scoring by quarter: 16–21, 17–11, 9–23, 20–9
Pts: Polleros, Bessoir 20; Rebs: Adams 12; Asts: Adams 6		Pts: Green 27; Rebs: Green 9 Asts: Guirantes 10

Arena Izzi, Sofia, Bulgaria (Note: The game was played at a neutral venue after Lointek Gernika Bizkaia refused to host Elitzur Ramla for political reasons.)
Referees: Giacomo Dori (ITA), Michal Scholze (CZE), Monika Mincheva (BUL)

=== Group D ===
Pos	Team	Pld	W	L	PF	PA	PD	Pts	Qualification	KAN	GEA	SZE	SEP
1	(Belgium) Kangoeroes Basket Mechelen	6	5	1	481	401	+80	11	Play-off Round 1	—	86–69	81–70	91–55
2	(Italy) GEAS Basket	6	3	3	427	389	+38	9 (Note: GEAS Basket 149–144 TARR KSC Szekszárd)	Play-off Round 1	54–72	—	76–66	77–44
3	(Hungary) TARR KSC Szekszárd	6	3	3	433	434	−1	9		74–69	78–73	—	82–86
4	(Romania) ACS Sepsi SIC	6	1	5	356	473	−117	7		79–83	43–78	49–63	—

Source: EuroCup Women
Rules for classification: 1) Points; 2) Points difference; 3) Points scored.
Notes:

8 October 2025
18:00

Boxscore

TARR KSC Szekszárd (Hungary)	78–73	(Italy) GEAS Basket
Scoring by quarter: 16–31, 22–12, 27–18, 13–12
Pts: Karlen 17; Rebs: Karlen 9 Asts: Theodorean 4		Pts: Moore 21; Rebs: Moore 8 Asts: Conti, Moore 4

Szekszárd Városi Sportcsarnok, Szekszárd
Attendance: 650
Referees: Michal Scholze (CZE), Eduard Uhrin (SVK), Josip Mikulić (CRO)

9 October 2025
20:00

Boxscore

Kangoeroes Basket Mechelen (Belgium)	91–55	(Romania) ACS Sepsi SIC
Scoring by quarter: 22–18, 20–15, 31–12, 18–10
Pts: Todd-Williams 25; Rebs: Vilcinskas 9 Asts: Nauwelaers 10		Pts: Davis, Szabo 12; Rebs: three players 3 Asts: Davis 7

Winketkaai, Mechelen
Attendance: 150
Referees: Iain Macdonald (GBR), Martin Demierre (SUI), Lauri Jäämaa (FIN)

15 October 2025
18:00

Boxscore

GEAS Basket (Italy)	54–72	(Belgium) Kangoeroes Basket Mechelen
Scoring by quarter: 15–19, 18–17, 11–17, 10–19
Pts: Moore 14; Rebs: Scott 9 Asts: Conti 6		Pts: Todd-Williams 19; Rebs: Todd-Williams 12; Asts: Nauwelaers 8

PalaAllende, Milan
Referees: Esperanza Mendoza (ESP), Nace Mohorič (SLO), Azra Mušić (SLO)

15 October 2025
19:00

Boxscore

ACS Sepsi SIC (Romania)	49–63	(Hungary) TARR KSC Szekszárd
Scoring by quarter: 12–13, 11–16, 13–17, 13–17
Pts: Potter 16; Rebs: Davis 8 Asts: Davis 3		Pts: Karlen 17; Rebs: Karlen 13; Asts: Rodrigues 5

Sala Sporturilor Szabo Kati, Sfântu Gheorghe
Attendance: 600
Referees: Megaklis-Konstantinos Marinakis (GRE), Andrej Zlatevski (MKD), Ivan Mijalkovski (MKD)

22 October 2025
18:00

Boxscore

GEAS Basket (Italy)	77–44	(Romania) ACS Sepsi SIC
Scoring by quarter: 24–10, 16–18, 23–10, 14–6
Pts: Moore, Roumy 16; Rebs: Moore 11; Asts: Attura 6		Pts: Mérész 16; Rebs: Gereben 7 Asts: Szabó 6

PalaAllende, Milan
Attendance: 410
Referees: Domen Krajnc (SLO), Aikaterini Asimakaki, (GRE), Martin Demierre (SUI)

23 October 2025
20:30

Boxscore

Kangoeroes Basket Mechelen (Belgium)	81–70	(Hungary) TARR KSC Szekszárd
Scoring by quarter: 18–18, 22–15, 26–24, 15–13
Pts: Nicholson 21; Rebs: Nicholson 12; Asts: Nauwelaers 9		Pts: Karlen 25; Rebs: Karlen 11; Asts: Rodrigues 4

Winketkaai, Mechelen
Attendance: 335
Referees: Josh Bowe (GBR), Laure Coanus (FRA), Blazo Begenisic (SWE)

29 October 2025
17:00

Boxscore

GEAS Basket (Italy)	76–66	(Hungary) TARR KSC Szekszárd
Scoring by quarter: 24–14, 9–20, 23–18, 20–14
Pts: Moore 23; Rebs: Trucco 9 Asts: Scott 6		Pts: Karlen 24; Rebs: Karlen 9 Asts: Dombai 5

PalaAllende, Milan
Attendance: 200
Referees: Nikola Perlić (CRO), Gregor Oprčkal (SLO), Teo Miletić (CRO)

30 October 2025
19:00

Boxscore

ACS Sepsi SIC (Romania)	79–82 (OT)	(Belgium) Kangoeroes Basket Mechelen
Scoring by quarter: 24–19, 13–15, 16–15, 14–18, Overtime: 7–7, 5–8
Pts: Potter 23; Rebs: Potter 10; Asts: Szabó 4		Pts: Nicholson 32; Rebs: Nicholson 18; Asts: Nauwelaers 6

Sala Sporturilor Szabo Kati, Sfântu Gheorghe
Attendance: 400
Referees: Peter Zenis (SVK), Megaklis-Konstantinos Marinakis (GRE), Eirini Margarita Tsantali (GRE)

5 November 2025
18:00

Boxscore

TARR KSC Szekszárd (Hungary)	82–86	(Romania) ACS Sepsi SIC
Scoring by quarter: 15–24, 23–25, 20–20, 24–17
Pts: Karlen 24; Rebs: Karlen 9 Asts: Dombai 10		Pts: Mérész 24; Rebs: Potter 10; Asts: Mérész 7

Szekszárd Városi Sportcsarnok, Szekszárd
Attendance: 650
Referees: Suzana Vujicić (MNE), Luka Manojlovic (SRB), Eduard Uhrin (SVK)

5 November 2025
20:30

Boxscore

Kangoeroes Basket Mechelen (Belgium)	86–69	(Italy) GEAS Basket
Scoring by quarter: 25–14, 11–20, 29–19, 21–16
Pts: Todd-Williams 18; Rebs: three players 8 Asts: Nauwelaers 7		Pts: Moore 24; Rebs: Moore 7 Asts: Scott, Attura 4

Winketkaai, Mechelen
Attendance: 200
Referees: Tijmen Last (NED), Filip Oliver Szczęsny (NOR), Lynn Weiwers (LUX)

26 November 2025
18:00

Boxscore

TARR KSC Szekszárd (Hungary)	74–69	(Belgium) Kangoeroes Basket Mechelen
Scoring by quarter: 15–18, 19–8, 21–18, 19–25
Pts: Karlen 26; Rebs: Karlen 11; Asts: Dombai 11		Pts: Todd-Williams 18; Rebs: Todd-Williams 10; Asts: van den Adel, Kibedi 4

Szekszárd Városi Sportcsarnok, Szekszárd
Attendance: 750
Referees: Stefan Zdravković (SRB), Azra Mušić (SLO), Mladen Lucic (MNE)

27 November 2025
19:00

Boxscore

ACS Sepsi SIC (Romania)	43–78	(Italy) GEAS Basket
Scoring by quarter: 8–18, 9–13, 10–25, 16–22
Pts: Mérész 16; Rebs: Mérész 9 Asts: Catinean, Szabó 3		Pts: Roumy 16; Rebs: Scott 9 Asts: Scott 4

Sala Sporturilor Szabo Kati, Sfântu Gheorghe
Attendance: 350
Referees: Kyriacos Christou (CYP), Milan Sibinović (SRB), Luka Brekalo (BIH)

=== Group E ===
Pos	Team	Pld	W	L	PF	PA	PD	Pts	Qualification	CRV	EML	TTT	SAA
1	(Serbia) KKZ Crvena zvezda	6	6	0	489	398	+91	12	Play-off Round 1	—	89–77	84–66	78–65
2	(Turkey) Emlak Konut SK	6	4	2	470	423	+47	10	Play-off Round 1	69–77	—	84–56	89–69
3	(Latvia) TTT Riga	6	2	4	402	453	−51	8		66–82	59–70	—	75–61
4	(Germany) Saarlouis Royals	6	0	6	395	482	−87	6		55–79	73–81	72–80	—

Source: EuroCup Women
Rules for classification: 1) Points; 2) Points difference; 3) Points scored.

8 October 2025
18:00

Boxscore

Saarlouis Royals (Germany)	73–81	(Turkey) Emlak Konut SK
Scoring by quarter: 15–19, 28–20, 13–21, 17–21
Pts: Lehtoranta 16; Rebs: Eichmeyer, Sila 5 Asts: Burse 6		Pts: Ndour-Fall 35; Rebs: Ndour-Fall 10; Asts: Delaere, Thomas 7

Stadtgartenhalle, Saarlouis
Attendance: 600
Referees: Jurgen Muho (LUX), Kirsten Poffé (BEL), Pierre Gilis (BEL)

9 October 2025
19:00

Boxscore

TTT Riga (Latvia)	66–82	(Serbia) KKZ Crvena zvezda
Scoring by quarter: 20–16, 15–19, 8–21, 23–26
Pts: Becker 24; Rebs: Becker 9 Asts: Pulvere 5		Pts: Fankam 23; Rebs: Fankam 14; Asts: Fankam, Lisowa Mbaka 4

Rimi Olympic Centre, Riga
Attendance: 100
Referees: Ivo Kitsing (EST), Joona Haaja (FIN), Andžej Urbanovič (LTU)

15 October 2025
18:00

Boxscore

KKZ Crvena zvezda (Serbia)	78–65	(Germany) Saarlouis Royals
Scoring by quarter: 22–11, 25–21, 11–11, 20–22
Pts: Sujic 17; Rebs: Fankam 10; Asts: Anderson 6		Pts: Lehtoranta 14; Rebs: Burse 10; Asts: Burse 8

Ranko Žeravica Sports Hall, Belgrade
Attendance: 200
Referees: Jan Baloun (CZE), Viktor Nagy (HUN), László Goda (HUN)

16 October 2025
19:00

Boxscore

Emlak Konut SK (Turkey)	84–56	(Latvia) TTT Riga
Scoring by quarter: 16–12, 22–10, 32–14, 14–20
Pts: Macaulay 17; Rebs: Macaulay 12; Asts: Thomas 6		Pts: Pulvere 12; Rebs: Becker 7 Asts: Becker 4

Basaksehir Genclik ve Spor Tesisleri, Istanbul
Attendance: 170
Referees: Haris Bijedić (BIH), Teo Miletić (CRO), Xhelal Mumini (KOS)

22 October 2025
18:30

Boxscore

Emlak Konut SK (Turkey)	69–77	(Serbia) KKZ Crvena zvezda
Scoring by quarter: 11–14, 18–19, 23–20, 17–24
Pts: Sertoglu 21; Rebs: Ndour 10; Asts: Thomas 10		Pts: Fankam 21; Rebs: Fankam 11; Asts: Anderson 5

Basaksehir Genclik ve Spor Tesisleri, Istanbul
Attendance: 321
Referees: Balázs Mészáros (HUN), Veronika Vavrova (CZE), Megaklis-Konstantinos Marinakis (GRE)

23 October 2025
19:00

Boxscore

TTT Riga (Latvia)	75–61	(Germany) Saarlouis Royals
Scoring by quarter: 17–16, 21–9, 17–24, 20–12
Pts: Pulvere 18; Rebs: Becker 13; Asts: Becker 7		Pts: Eichmeyer 18; Rebs: Eichmeyer 8 Asts: Burse 5

Rimi Olympic Centre, Riga
Attendance: 138
Referees: Hendrik Lass (EST), Milita Stalaucinskaite (LTU), Gabrielius Simonavičius (LTU)

30 October 2025
19:00

Boxscore

Emlak Konut SK (Turkey)	89–69	(Germany) Saarlouis Royals
Scoring by quarter: 35–10, 19–18, 22–24, 13–17
Pts: Ndour-Fall 25; Rebs: Ndour-Fall 12; Asts: Thomas 10		Pts: Burse 14; Rebs: Eichmeyer 7 Asts: Eichmeyer 4

Basaksehir Genclik ve Spor Tesisleri, Istanbul
Attendance: 180
Referees: Esperanza Mendoza (ESP), Ewa Matuszewska (POL), Suzana Vujičić (MNE)

30 October 2025
18:00

Boxscore

KKZ Crvena zvezda (Serbia)	84–66	(Latvia) TTT Riga
Scoring by quarter: 26–16, 30–17, 15–15, 13–18
Pts: Fankam 20; Rebs: Fankam 9 Asts: Lisowa Mbaka 5		Pts: Becker 14; Rebs: Becker 6 Asts: Pilabere 4

Ranko Žeravica Sports Hall, Belgrade
Attendance: 150
Referees: Nikolaos Tziopanos (GRE), Petr Blahout (CZE), Dimitar Georgiev (BUL)

5 November 2025
19:00

Boxscore

TTT Riga (Latvia)	59–70	(Turkey) Emlak Konut SK
Scoring by quarter: 14–17, 18–11, 10–25, 17–17
Pts: Pilabere 19; Rebs: Pilabere 12; Asts: Pilabere 3		Pts: Ndour-Fall 21; Rebs: Macaulay 8 Asts: Thomas 8

Rimi Olympic Centre, Riga
Attendance: 120
Referees: Joona Haaja (FIN), Oleksandr Oparin (UKR), Indrė Balnionytė-Gecevičienė (LTU)

5 November 2025
18:00

Boxscore

Saarlouis Royals (Germany)	55–79	(Serbia) KKZ Crvena zvezda
Scoring by quarter: 19–15, 14–24, 9–25, 13–15
Pts: Eichmeyer 13; Rebs: Shoup Hill 8 Asts: Burse 6		Pts: Fankam 21; Rebs: Fankam 11; Asts: Anderson 5

Stadtgartenhalle, Saarlouis
Attendance: 590
Referees: Amal Dahra (FRA), Bartłomiej Kucharski (POL), Laure Coanus (FRA)

26 November 2025
18:00

Boxscore

Saarlouis Royals (Germany)	72–80	(Latvia) TTT Riga
Scoring by quarter: 20–15, 18–25, 24–13, 10–27
Pts: Eichmeyer 15; Rebs: Eichmeyer 11; Asts: Eichmeyer 4		Pts: Becker 26; Rebs: Becker 7 Asts: Pilabere 8

Stadtgartenhalle, Saarlouis
Attendance: 450
Referees: Michail Papaioannou (SUI), Irene Frosolini (ITA), Romana Rea Car (AUT)

26 November 2025

Boxscore

KKZ Crvena zvezda (Serbia)	89–77	(Turkey) Emlak Konut SK
Scoring by quarter: 35–18, 18–19, 13–21, 23–19
Pts: Katanić 17; Rebs: Fankam 13; Asts: Anderson 6		Pts: Thomas 18; Rebs: Macaulay 6 Asts: Thomas 6

Ranko Žeravica Sports Hall, Belgrade
Attendance: 80
Referees: Vladmir Zanev (BUL), Vlad-Theodor Cotrobas-Dascalu (ROU), Rúben Györfy (HUN)

=== Group F ===
Pos	Team	Pld	W	L	PF	PA	PD	Pts	Qualification	RUT	KIR	PEJ	LEV
1	(Germany) Rutronik Stars Keltern	6	6	0	495	358	+137	12	Play-off Round 1	—	76–63	92–57	91–49
2	(Lithuania) Kibirkštis-TOKS	6	4	2	532	442	+90	10	Play-off Round 1	69–87	—	85–69	108–73
3	(Kosovo) KBF Peja 03	6	1	5	396	517	−121	7 (Note: KBF Peja 03 148–146 Levhartice Chomutov)		60–83	62–111	—	75–81
4	(Czech Republic) Levhartice Chomutov	6	1	5	403	509	−106	7		60–66	75–96	65–73	—

Source: EuroCup Women
Rules for classification: 1) Points; 2) Points difference; 3) Points scored.
Notes:

8 October 2025
19:00

Boxscore

Levhartice Chomutov (Czech Republic)	65–73	(Kosovo) KBF Peja 03
Scoring by quarter: 19–16, 19–12, 10–19, 17–26
Pts: Brejchová, Fučíková 14; Rebs: Bartoňová 10; Asts: Bartoňová 15		Pts: Wembanyama 27; Rebs: Brown 12; Asts: three players 3

City Sports Hall, Chomutov
Attendance: 462
Referees: Nikola Perlic (CRO), Ewa Matuszewska (POL), Bartłomiej Kucharski (POL)

9 October 2025
18:30

Boxscore

Rutronik Stars Keltern (Germany)	76–63	(Lithuania) Kibirkštis-TOKS
Scoring by quarter: 25–19, 16–11, 13–12, 22–21
Pts: Konstantinova, Rosic 13; Rebs: Wilke 8 Asts: Konstantinova 4		Pts: Dean, Radić 16; Rebs: Green, Radić 6 Asts: Labuckienė 4

Speiterlinghalle, Keltern
Attendance: 200
Referees: Jurgen Muho (LUX), Kirsten Poffé (BEL), Pierre Gilis (BEL)

15 October 2025
19:00

Boxscore

Levhartice Chomutov (Czech Republic)	60–66	(Germany) Rutronik Stars Keltern
Scoring by quarter: 20–18, 15–15, 13–20, 12–13
Pts: Fučíková 15; Rebs: Seka 7 Asts: Bartoňová 6		Pts: Wilke 13; Rebs: Kiss-Rusk 11; Asts: Konstantinova 5

City Sports Hall, Chomutov
Attendance: 513
Referees: Primož Pipan (SLO), Bogna Podkowinska (POL), Mateusz Skorek (POL)

16 October 2025
19:00

Boxscore

Kibirkštis-TOKS (Lithuania)	85–69	(Kosovo) KBF Peja 03
Scoring by quarter: 25–24, 25–15, 18–13, 17–16
Pts: Dean 18; Rebs: Green 14; Asts: Dean 6		Pts: Brown 11; Rebs: Koita 8 Asts: Perquku 7

Active Vilnius Arena, Vilnius
Attendance: 125
Referees: Michal Chrakowiecki (POL), Elias Anttonen (FIN), Michal Kuzia (POL)

22 October 2025
19:00

Boxscore

Levhartice Chomutov (Czech Republic)	75–96	(Lithuania) Kibirkštis-TOKS
Scoring by quarter: 16–22, 16–25, 25–19, 18–30
Pts: Brejchová 21; Rebs: Bartoňová 10; Asts: Bartoňová 7		Pts: Dean 21; Rebs: Labuckienė 9 Asts: Dean 6

City Sports Hall, Chomutov
Attendance: 442
Referees: Maria Ignatiou (CYP), Bartłomiej Kucharski (POL), Pierre Gilis (BEL)

23 October 2025
18:30

Boxscore

Rutronik Stars Keltern (Germany)	92–57	(Kosovo) KBF Peja 03
Scoring by quarter: 35–9, 16–14, 18–10, 23–24
Pts: Huijbens 19; Rebs: Wilke 10; Asts: Konstantinova 7		Pts: Wembanyama 22; Rebs: Wembanyama 6 Asts: Allen 4

Speiterlinghalle, Keltern
Attendance: 200
Referees: Jules Gaduel (FRA), Andras Mate Stretea (ROU), Lynn Weiwers (LUX)

29 October 2025
19:00

Boxscore

KBF Peja 03 (Kosovo)	75–81 (OT)	(Czech Republic) Levhartice Chomutov
Scoring by quarter: 23–18, 14–18, 15–23, 20–13, Overtime: 3–9
Pts: Allen 27; Rebs: Brown 10; Asts: Përçuku 5		Pts: Fučíková 17; Rebs: Rošková 7 Asts: Bartoňová 10

Palestra e Sporteve "Karagaç", Peja
Attendance: 300
Referees: Nace Mohorič (SLO), Ivan Mijalkovski (MKD), Stefan Kuburović (MNE)

30 October 2025
19:00

Boxscore

Kibirkštis-TOKS (Lithuania)	69–87	(Germany) Rutronik Stars Keltern
Scoring by quarter: 15–25, 19–16, 18–21, 17–25
Pts: Dean 14; Rebs: Meškonytė, Radić 4 Asts: Green, Meškonytė 4		Pts: Wilke 25; Rebs: Huijbens 6 Asts: Konstantinova 8

Active Vilnius Arena, Vilnius
Attendance: 417
Referees: Balász Mészáros (HUN), Lauri Jäämaa (FIN), Raimonds Repelis (LAT)

5 November 2025
18:30

Boxscore

Rutronik Stars Keltern (Germany)	91–49	(Czech Republic) Levhartice Chomutov
Scoring by quarter: 30–10, 18–20, 25–8, 18–11
Pts: Kiss-Rusk 18; Rebs: Kiss-Rusk 9 Asts: Kiss-Rusk, Konstantinova 7		Pts: Rokošová 13; Rebs: Rokošová 7 Asts: four players 2

Speiterlinghalle, Keltern
Attendance: 200
Referees: Aleksandar Radonjic (AUT), Hugo Blanco Marques da Silva (POR), Mia Maesano Krapinec (CRO)

5 November 2025
19:00

Boxscore

KBF Peja 03 (Kosovo)	62–111	(Lithuania) Kibirkštis-TOKS
Scoring by quarter: 17–33, 22–25, 17–26, 6–27
Pts: Lawrence 26; Rebs: Brown 6 Asts: Përçuku 4		Pts: Nacickaitė 25; Rebs: Labuckienė, Ūsė 9 Asts: Dean 9

Palestra e Sporteve "Karagaç", Peja
Attendance: 100
Referees: Ventsislav Velikov (BUL), Orhan Çağrı Hekimoğlu (TUR), Jānis Rozenbergs (LAT)

27 November 2025
19:00

Boxscore

Kibirkštis-TOKS (Lithuania)	108–73	(Czech Republic) Levhartice Chomutov
Scoring by quarter: 29–23, 18–12, 29–22, 32–16
Pts: Nacickaitė 19; Rebs: Radić 7 Asts: Labuckienė 6		Pts: Rokošová 15; Rebs: Mezihoráková, Rokošová 6 Asts: Mezihoráková 5

Active Vilnius Arena, Vilnius
Attendance: 173
Referees: Nikola Bejat (NOR), Jemina Sofia Vahakytta (FIN), Raphaela Reiner (AUT)

27 November 2025
19:00

Boxscore

KBF Peja 03 (Kosovo)	60–83	(Germany) Rutronik Stars Keltern
Scoring by quarter: 17–18, 14–21, 19–31, 10–13
Pts: Brown 18; Rebs: Brown 12; Asts: three players 4		Pts: Rosić 17; Rebs: Huijbens 17; Asts: Kiss-Rusk 6

Palestra e Sporteve "Karagaç", Peja
Attendance: 50
Referees: Özlem Yalman (TUR), Suzana Vujicic (MNE), Josip Mikulić (CRO)

=== Group G ===
Pos	Team	Pld	W	L	PF	PA	PD	Pts	Qualification	AVE	PAN	NEP	NYO
1	(Spain) Perfumerias Avenida	6	5	1	492	385	+107	11	Play-off Round 1	—	70–78	79–48	81–53
2	(Greece) Panathinaikos AC	6	4	2	516	511	+5	10	Play-off Round 1	73–92	—	94–87	100–113
3	(Lithuania) BC Neptūnas-Amberton	6	2	4	432	487	−55	8		61–88	69–82	—	86–79
4	(Switzerland) Nyon Basket Feminin	6	1	5	462	519	−57	7		72–82	80–89	65–81	—

Source: EuroCup Women
Rules for classification: 1) Points; 2) Points difference; 3) Points scored.

9 October 2025
18:00

Boxscore

Panathinaikos AC (Greece)	73–92	(Spain) Perfumerias Avenida
Scoring by quarter: 20–19, 19–22, 19–30, 15–21
Pts: Krimili 16; Rebs: Prince, Vitola 7 Asts: Krimili 7		Pts: Zellous 24; Rebs: Cave 9 Asts: Soriano 5

Cholargos Sports Hall, Athens
Attendance: 442
Referees: Ori Shalhavi (ISR), Nir Meirson (ISR), Alin Faur (ROU)

9 October 2025
19:00

Boxscore

Nyon Basket Feminin (Switzerland)	65–81	(Lithuania) BC Neptūnas-Amberton
Scoring by quarter: 12–14, 20–26, 22–18, 11–23
Pts: Uro-Nile 23; Rebs: Uro-Nile 14; Asts: four players 3		Pts: Vilka 18; Rebs: Solopova 9 Asts: Paliulyte 4

Salle Omnisport de Gland - Complexe Grand Champs, Nyon
Attendance: 250
Referees: Dennis Sirowi (GER), Irene Frosolini (ITA),Teo Miletić (CRO)

15 October 2025
20:30

Boxscore

Perfumerias Avenida (Spain)	81–53	(Switzerland) Nyon Basket Feminin
Scoring by quarter: 34–19, 12–9, 17–13, 18–12
Pts: Martín 18; Rebs: Cave 9 Asts: three players 4		Pts: Formann, Uro-Nile 15; Rebs: Formann 12; Asts: Robinson 3

Pabellón Municipal Wurzburg, Salamanca
Attendance: 2,256
Referees: Tom Dehondt (BEL), Pierre Landy (FRA), Veronika Vavrova (CZE)

16 October 2025
19:00

Boxscore

BC Neptūnas-Amberton (Lithuania)	69–82	(Greece) Panathinaikos AC
Scoring by quarter: 18–22, 24–11, 7–24, 20–25
Pts: Bickle 22; Rebs: Mihalko 15; Asts: Sinickaite 5		Pts: Brown 19; Rebs: Brown 9 Asts: Fitzgerald 7

Palangos Sporto Centro Arena, Palanga
Attendance: 100
Referees: Tomasz Wit Langowski (POL), Ivo Kitsing (EST), Rafiks Misirovs (LAT)

23 October 2025
18:00

Boxscore

Panathinaikos AC (Greece)	100–113	(Switzerland) Nyon Basket Feminin
Scoring by quarter: 26–37, 25–19, 16–24, 33–33
Pts: Fitzgerald 44; Rebs: Chatzileonti 11; Asts: Fitzgerald 6		Pts: Formann 30; Rebs: Robinson 16; Asts: Formann, Robinson 7

Cholargos Sports Hall, Athens
Attendance: 655
Referees: Peter Ženiš (SVK), Luka Manojlovic (SRB), Stefan Vukovic (MNE)

23 October 2025
19:00

Boxscore

BC Neptūnas-Amberton (Lithuania)	61–88	(Spain) Perfumerias Avenida
Scoring by quarter: 18–25, 10–26, 16–14, 17–23
Pts: Liepiņa 12; Rebs: Solopova 5 Asts: Paliulytė 3		Pts: Cave 21; Rebs: Cave 10; Asts: Martín 8

Švyturio Arena, Klaipėda
Attendance: 103
Referees: Mart Uuehendrik (EST), Kristīne Simanoviča (LAT), Joona Haaja (FIN)

29 October 2025
19:00

Boxscore

BC Neptūnas-Amberton (Lithuania)	86–79	(Switzerland) Nyon Basket Feminin
Scoring by quarter: 20–18, 27–17, 23–16, 16–28
Pts: Sinickaitė 22; Rebs: Mihalko 7 Asts: Sinickaitė, Vilka 5		Pts: Uro-Nilie 28; Rebs: Robinson 9 Asts: Robinson 6

Švyturio Arena, Klaipėda
Attendance: 439
Referees: Balász Mészáros (HUN), Lauri Jäämaa (FIN), Raimonds Repelis (LAT)

29 October 2025
20:30

Boxscore

Perfumerias Avenida (Spain)	70–78	(Greece) Panathinaikos AC
Scoring by quarter: 23–26, 19–14, 16–15, 12–23
Pts: Soriano 19; Rebs: Cave 9 Asts: Martín 5		Pts: Galanopoulos 20; Rebs: three players 5 Asts: Fitzgerald 11

Pabellón Municipal Wurzburg, Salamanca
Attendance: 2,347
Referees: Tiago Roxo Perdigão (POR), Kirsten Poffé (BEL), Hugo Blanco Marques da Silva (POR)

5 November 2025
18:30

Boxscore

Panathinaikos AC (Greece)	94–87	(Lithuania) BC Neptūnas-Amberton
Scoring by quarter: 20–29, 25–13, 21–22, 28–23
Pts: Fitzgerald, Chatzileonti 29; Rebs: Chatzileonti 11; Asts: Fitzgerald 6		Pts: Bickle 23; Rebs: Mihalko 8 Asts: Sinickaitė 8

Cholargos Sports Hall, Athens
Attendance: 630
Referees: Peter Zenis (SVK), Natalie Galuk (ISR), Stefan Kuburović (MNE)

5 November 2025
19:00

Boxscore

Nyon Basket Feminin (Switzerland)	72–82	(Spain) Perfumerias Avenida
Scoring by quarter: 12–24, 21–23, 24–16, 15–19
Pts: Formann 29; Rebs: Uro-Nilie 7 Asts: Coffee 4		Pts: Cave 19; Rebs: Cave 14; Asts: Zellous 6

Salle Omnisport de Gland - Complexe Grand Champs, Nyon
Referees: Oleksandr Dotsenko (LUX), Jules Gaduel (FRA), Christopher Lemaire (FRA)

26 November 2025
20:30

Boxscore

Perfumerias Avenida (Spain)	79–48	(Lithuania) BC Neptūnas-Amberton
Scoring by quarter: 27–14, 24–12, 8–9, 20–13
Pts: Spreafico, Cave 11; Rebs: Cave 8 Asts: Soriano, Martín 5		Pts: Sinickaitė 17; Rebs: Liepiņa 9 Asts: Vilka 3

Pabellón Municipal Wurzburg, Salamanca
Attendance: 2,389
Referees: José Pedroso (POR), Pierre Landy (FRA), Luís Daniel Mascarenhas de Oliveira (POR)

27 November 2025
19:00

Boxscore

Nyon Basket Feminin (Switzerland)	80–89	(Greece) Panathinaikos AC
Scoring by quarter: 29–25, 13–16, 14–23, 24–25
Pts: Vilolo 18; Rebs: Uro-Nilie 14; Asts: Robinson 8		Pts: Prince 25; Rebs: Fitzgerald, Chatzileonti 10; Asts: Fitzgerald, Galanopoulos 5

Salle Omnisport de Gland - Complexe Grand Champs, Nyon
Attendance: 400
Referees: Tom de Lange (BEL), Julien Malane (LUX), Romana Stojanović (CRO)

=== Group H ===
Pos	Team	Pld	W	L	PF	PA	PD	Pts	Qualification	BLMA	BRN	DIN	RAG
1	(France) BLMA	6	6	0	555	371	+184	12	Play-off Round 1	—	77–70	101–72	105–48
2	(Czech Republic) KP Brno	6	4	2	385	326	+59	10	Play-off Round 1	60–88	—	76–73	74–42
3	(Italy) BDS Dinamo Sassari	6	2	4	353	385	−32	7		67–84	0–20 (Note: The match was abandoned after a power outage at the venue, with BDS Dinamo Sassari leading 69–67. FIBA awarded KP Brno a 20–0 forfeit win.)	—	80–53
4	(Croatia) ŽKK Ragusa	6	0	6	294	505	−211	6		54–100	46–85	51–61	—

Source: EuroCup Women
Rules for classification: 1) Points; 2) Points difference; 3) Points scored.

8 October 2025
18:00

Boxscore

KP Brno (Czech Republic)	60–88	(France) BLMA
Scoring by quarter: 21–28, 12–25, 20–20, 7–15
Pts: Kopecká 19; Rebs: Calvert 7 Asts: Kopecká, Vondrackova 6		Pts: Breen, Hoppie 18; Rebs: Breen, Rabot 8 Asts: Bernies 4

Starez Arena Vodova, Brno
Attendance: 543
Referees: Nace Mohorič (SLO), Marton Makrai (HUN), Gregor Oprčkal (SLO)

9 October 2025
20:30

Boxscore

BDS Dinamo Sassari (Italy)	80–53	(Croatia) ŽKK Ragusa
Scoring by quarter: 22–14, 21–16, 22–10, 15–13
Pts: Turel 14; Rebs: Sammartino 11; Asts: Trozzola 4		Pts: Keedi 15; Rebs: three players 5 Asts: Miloglav, Todorić 4

PalaSerradimigni, Sassari
Attendance: 496
Referees: Domen Krajnc (SLO), Danilo Petkovic (SRB), Nemanja Vlahovic (SRB)

16 October 2025
19:00

Boxscore

ŽKK Ragusa (Croatia)	46–85	(Czech Republic) KP Brno
Scoring by quarter: 3–21, 15–16, 16–23, 12–25
Pts: Mandić 13; Rebs: Todorić 7 Asts: Miloglav 5		Pts: Svatoňová, Swartz 18; Rebs: Kopecká 8 Asts: Hibalova 6

Gospino Polje, Dubrovnik
Attendance: 200
Referees: Edison Gjoni (ALB), Stefan Kuburovic (MNE), Milosav Kaludjerovic (MNE)

16 October 2025
20:00

Boxscore

BLMA (France)	101–72	(Italy) BDS Dinamo Sassari
Scoring by quarter: 30–21, 26–14, 25–21, 20–16
Pts: Cisse 23; Rebs: three players 6 Asts: Pospisilova 8		Pts: Treffers 18; Rebs: Treffers 6 Asts: Richards 4

Palais des Sports de Lattes, Lattes
Attendance: 1,104
Referees: Yasmina Alcaraz (ESP), Luís Daniel Mascarenhas de Oliveira (POR), Iyán Gonzalez Gálvez (ESP)

22 October 2025
18:00

Boxscore

KP Brno (Czech Republic)	76–73	(Italy) BDS Dinamo Sassari
Scoring by quarter: 24–16, 23–18, 12–23, 17–16
Pts: Galíčková 25; Rebs: Galíčková 15; Asts: Žílová 6		Pts: Richards 28; Rebs: Treffers 12; Asts: Carangelo 5

Starez Arena Vodova, Brno
Attendance: 516
Referees: Aleksandar Radonjic (AUT), Diana Lapanović (SLO), Filip Oliver Szczesny (NOR)

23 October 2025
19:00

Boxscore

ŽKK Ragusa (Croatia)	54–100	(France) BLMA
Scoring by quarter: 11–27, 22–24, 12–26, 9–23
Pts: Mandić 13; Rebs: Todorić, Mandić 7 Asts: Todorić 4		Pts: Cissé 28; Rebs: Cissé, Breen 8 Asts: Hoppie 6

Gospino Polje, Dubrovnik
Attendance: 100
Referees: Sava Cetković (MNE), Xhelal Mumini (KOS), Fatjon Malevi (ALB)

29 October 2025
20:00

Boxscore

BLMA (France)	77–70	(Czech Republic) KP Brno
Scoring by quarter: 22–15, 24–12, 16–14, 15–29
Pts: Breen 15; Rebs: Breen 9 Asts: Rabot 9		Pts: Vondráčková 17; Rebs: Calvert 7 Asts: three players 3

Palais des Sports de Lattes, Lattes
Attendance: 1,082
Referees: Iyán González Gálvez (ESP), Emma Perry (IRL), Tom de Lange (BEL)

30 October 2025
19:00

Boxscore

ŽKK Ragusa (Croatia)	51–61	(Italy) BDS Dinamo Sassari
Scoring by quarter: 17–19, 10–10, 14–17, 10–15
Pts: Vučković 13; Rebs: Todorić 15; Asts: Miloglav 6		Pts: Treffers 15; Rebs: Poindexter 7 Asts: Carangelo 11

Gospino Polje, Dubrovnik
Attendance: 200
Referees: Stefan Vuković (MNE), Bartłomiej Kucharski (POL), Jakub Izak (SVK)

5 November 2025
18:00

Boxscore

KP Brno (Czech Republic)	74–42	(Croatia) ŽKK Ragusa
Scoring by quarter: 18–10, 22–11, 17–10, 17–11
Pts: Swartz 15; Rebs: three players 6 Asts: Vondráčková 5		Pts: Vučković 13; Rebs: Todorić 9 Asts: Todorić 4

Starez Arena Vodova, Brno
Attendance: 628
Referees: Mehmet Şahin (TUR), Nikola Bejat (NOR), Karol Kowalski (FIN)

5 November 2025
20:30

Boxscore

BDS Dinamo Sassari (Italy)	67–84	(France) BLMA
Scoring by quarter: 26–14, 10–22, 21–22, 10–26
Pts: Poindexter 15; Rebs: Treffers 8 Asts: Carangelo 5		Pts: Breen 22; Rebs: Breen 9 Asts: Bernies 9

PalaSerradimigni, Sassari
Attendance: 342
Referees: Nikolaos Tziopanos (GRE), Rainis Värv (EST), Vladimir Zanev (BUL)

27 November 2025
20:00

Boxscore

BLMA (France)	107–48	(Croatia) ŽKK Ragusa
Scoring by quarter: 21–12, 31–18, 26–12, 27–6
Pts: Cissé 20; Rebs: Breen 9 Asts: Rabot 7		Pts: Zorić 10; Rebs: Todorić, Zorić 5 Asts: Strilić 5

Palais des Sports de Lattes, Lattes
Attendance: 1,047
Referees: Pierre Gilis (BEL), Maximilian Meiler (GER), Paulina Karolina Gajdosz (POL)

27 November 2025
20:30

Boxscore

BDS Dinamo Sassari (Italy)	0–20 (Note: The match was abandoned after a power outage at the venue, with BDS Dinamo Sassari leading 69–67. FIBA awarded KP Brno a 20–0 forfeit win.)	(Czech Republic) KP Brno
Scoring by quarter: 20–11, 16–24, 23–19, 10–13
Pts: Poindexter 19; Rebs: Richards 9 Asts: Carangelo, Boros 6		Pts: Calvert 16; Rebs: Calvert, Galickova 6 Asts: Vondrackova 6

PalaSerradimigni, Sassari
Referees: Ilias Karpanos (GRE), Goran Grbić (SLO), Danilo Petokvic (SRB)

=== Group I ===
Pos	Team	Pld	W	L	PF	PA	PD	Pts	Qualification	EST	UFAB	RAP	PIE
1	(Spain) Movistar Estudiantes	6	5	1	456	410	+46	11	Play-off Round 1	—	76–86	65–61	76–55
2	(France) UFAB 49	6	4	2	470	431	+39	10	Play-off Round 1	82–87	—	79–86	64–61
3	(Romania) CS Rapid București	6	3	3	425	422	+3	9	Play-off Round 1	74–88	64–78	—	69–51
4	(Slovakia) Piešťanské Čajky	6	0	6	337	425	−88	6		52–64	57–81	61–71	—

Source: EuroCup Women
Rules for classification: 1) Points; 2) Points difference; 3) Points scored.

8 October 2025
20:00

Boxscore

Movistar Estudiantes (Spain)	76–86	(France) UFAB 49
Scoring by quarter: 16–20, 23–23, 18–21, 19–22
Pts: Ezeigbo 19; Rebs: Bühner, Ezeigbo 7 Asts: Stanacev 4		Pts: Ndjock 28; Rebs: Zempare 9 Asts: three players 4

Polideportivo Antonio Magariños, Madrid
Attendance: 483
Referees: Goran Grbić (SLO), Hugo Blanco Marques da Silva (POR), Tom Dehondt (BEL)

9 October 2025
19:00

Boxscore

CS Rapid București (Romania)	69–51	(Slovakia) Piešťanské Čajky
Scoring by quarter: 18–22, 18–9, 18–14, 15–6
Pts: Mistinova 12; Rebs: Mistinova, Orban 8 Asts: Murray 4		Pts: Schwartz 16; Rebs: Schwartz 14; Asts: Herminjard 4

Polyvalent Hall, Bucharest
Attendance: 100
Referees: Dumitru Stasiev (MDA), Dimitar Georgiev (BUL), Svetlana Stoyanova (BUL)

15 October 2025
18:00

Boxscore

Piešťanské Čajky (Slovakia)	52–64	(Spain) Movistar Estudiantes
Scoring by quarter: 15–20, 8–12, 20–12, 9–20
Pts: Buknova 13; Rebs: Moravcikova 9 Asts: Herminjard 3		Pts: Bühner 18; Rebs: Ezeigbo 9 Asts: Ezeigbo, Stanacev 3

Diplomat Arena, Piešťany
Attendance: 732
Referees: Petr Hrusa (CZE), Rúben Györfy (HUN), Michal Scholze (CZE)

15 October 2025
20:00

Boxscore

UFAB 49 (France)	79–86	(Romania) CS Rapid București
Scoring by quarter: 23–31, 23–24, 16–20, 17–11
Pts: Mendez 21; Rebs: Diarisso 7 Asts: Mendez 5		Pts: Miroslava 33; Rebs: Miroslava 9 Asts: Părău 6

Salle Jean Bouin, Angers
Attendance: 1,609
Referees: Emma Perry (IRL), Kirsten Poffé (BEL), Gregor Oprčkal (SLO)

22 October 2025
18:00

Boxscore

Piešťanské Čajky (Slovakia)	57–81	(France) UFAB 49
Scoring by quarter: 15–16, 12–25, 14–25, 16–15
Pts: Schwarz 13; Rebs: three players 5 Asts: Schwarz 3		Pts: Dursus 19; Rebs: Dursus, Zempare 7 Asts: Méndez, Mahoutou 4

Diplomat Arena, PiešťanyArena, City
Attendance: 553
Referees: Martin Kučírek (CZE), László Goda (HUN), Tolga Akkuşoğlu (TUR)

22 October 2025
20:00

Boxscore

Movistar Estudiantes (Spain)	65–61	(Romania) CS Rapid București
Scoring by quarter: 18–24, 13–13, 13–11, 21–13
Pts: Ezeigbo 23; Rebs: Ezeigbo 19; Asts: Stanaćev 5		Pts: Murray 14; Rebs: Murray 11; Asts: Murray 3

Polideportivo Antonio Magariños, Madrid
Attendance: 354
Referees: James Kerry Dominique (GIB), Simon Unsworth (GBR), Nicolas Rotter (GER)

29 October 2025
17:00

Boxscore

Piešťanské Čajky (Slovakia)	61–71	(Romania) CS Rapid București
Scoring by quarter: 12–22, 19–13, 13–24, 17–12
Pts: Herminjard 23; Rebs: Kozáková 10; Asts: Buknová, Herminjard 4		Pts: Živković 20; Rebs: Orban, Murray 7 Asts: Murray 8

Diplomat Arena, Piešťany
Attendance: 400
Referees: Gabrielius Simonavičius (LTU), Serafim Petrov (BUL), Bogna Podkowińska (POL)

29 October 2025
20:00

Boxscore

UFAB 49 (France)	82–87	(Spain) Movistar Estudiantes
Scoring by quarter: 21–21, 16–17, 25–25, 20–24
Pts: Ndjock 32; Rebs: Diarisso 11; Asts: Diarisso 5		Pts: Bühner 17; Rebs: Ezeigbo 11; Asts: Stanaćev 12

Salle Jean Bouin, Angers
Attendance: 1,625
Referees: Josh Bowe (GBR), Irene Frossolini (ITA), Chess van Looy (BEL)

5 November 2025
19:00

Boxscore

CS Rapid București (Romania)	64–78	(France) UFAB 49
Scoring by quarter: 19–19, 25–16, 11–24, 9–19
Pts: Ćuić 26; Rebs: Ćuić 8 Asts: Murray 7		Pts: Dursus 21; Rebs: Ndjock 10; Asts: Méndez 8

Polyvalent Hall, Bucharest
Attendance: 350
Referees: Kyriacos Christou (CYP), Márton Makrai (HUN), Eirini Margarita Tsantali (GRE)

5 November 2025
20:00

Boxscore

Movistar Estudiantes (Spain)	76–55	(Slovakia) Piešťanské Čajky
Scoring by quarter: 20–13, 19–16, 18–13, 19–13
Pts: Bühner 21; Rebs: Bühner 9 Asts: Berkani 7		Pts: Schwarz 12; Rebs: Schwarz 12; Asts: Herminjard 4

Polideportivo Antonio Magariños, Madrid
Attendance: 362
Referees: José Pedroso (POR), Michail Papaioannou (SUI), Luís Daniel Mascarenhas de Oliveira (POR)

26 November 2025
20:00

Boxscore

UFAB 49 (France)	64–61	(Slovakia) Piešťanské Čajky
Scoring by quarter: 22–18, 8–11, 14–11, 20–21
Pts: Ndjock, Williams 15; Rebs: Diarisso 9 Asts: Ndjock 7		Pts: Herminjard 18; Rebs: Schwarz 13; Asts: Farcy 5

Salle Jean Bouin, Angers
Attendance: 1.670
Referees: Josh Bowe (GBR), Nicolas Rotter (GER), Milos Stokic (AUT)

27 November 2025
19:00

Boxscore

CS Rapid București (Romania)	74–88	(Spain) Movistar Estudiantes
Scoring by quarter: 18–22, 16–21, 26–22, 14–23
Pts: Kostowicz 25; Rebs: Ćuić, Kostowicz 6 Asts: Gödri-Părău, Murray 5		Pts: Berkani 27; Rebs: Bühner 9 Asts: Berkani 5

Polyvalent Hall, Bucharest
Attendance: 250
Referees: Nemanja Vlahovic (SRB), Milosav Kaludjerovic (MNE), Georgios Martinakos (GRE)

=== Group J ===
Pos	Team	Pld	W	L	PF	PA	PD	Pts	Qualification	ATH	CHA	BES	GOR
1	(Greece) Athinaikos Qualco	6	5	1	474	422	+52	11	Play-off Round 1	—	75–59	84–82	79–56
2	(France) Charnay Basket	6	3	3	453	454	−1	9 (Note: Charnay Basket 154–148 Beşiktaş Boa)	Play-off Round 1	69–75	—	67–59	84–70
3	(Turkey) Beşiktaş Boa	6	3	3	499	479	+20	9	Play-off Round 1	87–84	89–87	—	100–70
4	(Poland) KSSSE Enea AZS AJP Gorzów	6	1	5	438	509	−71	7		69–77	86–87	87–82	—

Source: EuroCup Women
Rules for classification: 1) Points; 2) Points difference; 3) Points scored.
Notes:

9 October 2025
19:00

Boxscore

KSSSE Enea AZS AJP Gorzów (Poland)	87–82	(Turkey) Beşiktaş Boa
Scoring by quarter: 22–19, 22–29, 24–12, 19–22
Pts: Owusu 28; Rebs: Telenga 12; Asts: Owusu 6		Pts: Bilgiç 25; Rebs: Fasoula 10; Asts: Fasoula 4

Arena Gorzów, Gorzów Wielkopolski
Attendance: 1,700
Referees: Nikola Bejat (NOR), Hendrik Lass (EST), Rafiks Misirovs (LAT)

10 October 2025 (Note: The match was originally scheduled for the 9 October but was rescheduled.)
17:00

Boxscore

Athinaikos Qualco (Greece)	75–59	(France) Charnay Basket
Scoring by quarter: 18–14, 23–18, 14–13, 20–14
Pts: Hristova 22; Rebs: Kiss 13; Asts: Winterburn 9		Pts: Drame 14; Rebs: three players 5 Asts: Drame 3

Dimitris Kaltsas Sports Hall, Athens
Attendance: 200
Referees: Veronika Obertova (SVK), Ivana Ivanovic (SRB), Amalia Marchiș (ROU)

15 October 2025
20:00

Boxscore

Charnay Basket (France)	84–70	(Poland) KSSSE Enea AZS AJP Gorzów
Scoring by quarter: 24–16, 19–18, 25–26, 16–10
Pts: Chevaugeon 22; Rebs: Thomas 6 Asts: Colas 9		Pts: Owusu 26; Rebs: Owusu, Telenga 8 Asts: Reid 6

Salle Maurice Chevalier, Charnay-lès-Mâcon
Attendance: 1,000
Referees: Joaquin Garcia (ESP), Sandra Sanchez (ESP), Giacomo Dori (ITA)

16 October 2025
20:00

Boxscore

Beşiktaş Boa (Turkey)	87–84	(Greece) Athinaikos Qualco
Scoring by quarter: 18–26, 24–20, 23–19, 22–19
Pts: Fasoula 29; Rebs: Fasoula 12; Asts: Toure 9		Pts: Hristova 17; Rebs: Prince 16; Asts: Winterburn 7

Besiktas Akatlar Arena, Istanbul
Attendance: 350
Referees: Stefan Vukovic (MNE), Marija Ciric (SRB), Sava Cetkovic (MNE)

23 October 2025
19:30

Boxscore

Athinaikos Qualco (Greece)	79–56	(Poland) KSSSE Enea AZS AJP Gorzów
Scoring by quarter: 18–10, 18–18, 27–7, 16–21
Pts: Prince 31; Rebs: Prince 13; Asts: Pavlopoulou 10		Pts: Hurt 18; Rebs: Hurt 10; Asts: Owusu, Reid 3

Dimitris Kaltsas Sports Hall, Athens
Attendance: 500
Referees: Nemanja Ninković (SRB), Orhan Çağrı Hekimoğlu (TUR), Teo Miletić (CRO)

23 October 2025
20:00

Boxscore

Charnay Basket (France)	67–59	(Turkey) Beşiktaş Boa
Scoring by quarter: 21–19, 11–7, 22–18, 13–15
Pts: Thomas 22; Rebs: Thomas, Touré 10; Asts: Daramy, Touré 4		Pts: Okonkwo 22; Rebs: Milić 10; Asts: Fasoula, Touré 5

Salle Maurice Chevalier, Charnay-lès-Mâcon
Attendance: 1,000
Referees: Emma Perry (IRL), Igor Esteve Malmierca (AND), Gavin Williams (GBR)

29 October 2025
20:00

Boxscore

Charnay Basket (France)	69–75	(Greece) Athinaikos Qualco
Scoring by quarter: 17–21, 17–25, 19–15, 16–14
Pts: Thomas 19; Rebs: Dalstra, Thomas 6 Asts: Daramy 3		Pts: Prince 17; Rebs: Kiss 13; Asts: Pavlopoulou, Parks 4

Salle Maurice Chevalier, Charnay-lès-Mâcon
Attendance: 1,200
Referees: Roberto Lucas Martínez (ESP), Martin Kučírek (CZE), Diogo Martins (POR)

30 October 2025
20:00

Boxscore

Beşiktaş Boa (Turkey)	100–70	(Poland) KSSSE Enea AZS AJP Gorzów
Scoring by quarter: 29–13, 22–17, 21–25, 28–15
Pts: Fasoula 21; Rebs: Milić 10; Asts: Whitcomb, Touré 6		Pts: Hurt 27; Rebs: Telenga 8 Asts: Reid 13

Besiktas Akatlar Arena, Istanbul
Attendance: 200
Referees: Viktor Nagy (HUN), Xhelal Mumini (KOS), Monika Mincheva (BUL)

5 November 2025
19:30

Boxscore

Athinaikos Qualco (Greece)	84–82 (OT)	(Turkey) Beşiktaş Boa
Scoring by quarter: 25–20, 26–20, 19–20, 5–15, Overtime: 9–7
Pts: Winterburn 19; Rebs: Parks 11; Asts: Winterburn 6		Pts: Okonkwo, Fasoula 21; Rebs: Okonkwo 11; Asts: Whitcomb, Touré 5

Dimitris Kaltsas Sports Hall, Athens
Attendance: 500
Referees: Sava Ćetković (MNE), Danilo Petković (SRB), Frane Mjeda (CRO)

5 November 2025
19:00

Boxscore

KSSSE Enea AZS AJP Gorzów (Poland)	86–87	(France) Charnay Basket
Scoring by quarter: 22–21, 23–27, 25–25, 16–14
Pts: Owusu 26; Rebs: Telenga 11; Asts: Reid 8		Pts: Chevaugeon 24; Rebs: Touré 8 Asts: Colas 6

Arena Gorzów, Gorzów Wielkopolski
Attendance: 1,500
Referees: Mart Uuehendrik (EST), Yurii Shcherbak (UKR), Iyán González Gálvez (ESP)

27 November 2025
20:00

Boxscore

Beşiktaş Boa (Turkey)	89–87 (OT)	(France) Charnay Basket
Scoring by quarter: 21–26, 17–21, 25–17, 19–18, Overtime: 7–5
Pts: Whitcomb, Touré 20; Rebs: Milić 7 Asts: Fasoula, Touré 7		Pts: Mayo 20; Rebs: Thomas 10; Asts: Colas, Chevaugeon 6

Besiktas Akatlar Arena, Istanbul
Attendance: 400
Referees: Haris Bijedić (BIH), Diana Lapanović (SLO), Edison Gjoni (ALB)

27 November 2025
19:00

Boxscore

KSSSE Enea AZS AJP Gorzów (Poland)	69–77	(Greece) Athinaikos Qualco
Scoring by quarter: 22–27, 13–24, 21–14, 13–12
Pts: Reid 21; Rebs: Telenga 14; Asts: Reid 4		Pts: Winterburn 17; Rebs: Winterburn 7 Asts: Tsineke 6

Arena Gorzów, Gorzów Wielkopolski
Attendance: 2,120
Referees: Blazo Begenisic (SWE), Indrė Balnionytė-Gecevičienė (LTU), Oleksandr Oparin (UKR)

=== Group K ===
Pos	Team	Pld	W	L	PF	PA	PD	Pts	Qualification	FER	ZAG	OST	BEN
1	(Spain) Baxi Ferrol	6	6	0	553	373	+180	12	Play-off Round 1	—	92–49	100–64	109–58
2	(Poland) MB Zagłębie Sosnowiec	6	4	2	433	448	−15	10	Play-off Round 1	83–90	—	86–69	73–63
3	(Czech Republic) SBŠ Ostrava	6	2	4	436	493	−57	8		64–98	69–76	—	85–52
4	(Portugal) SL Benfica	6	0	6	374	482	−108	6		55–64	65–66	81–85	—

Source: EuroCup Women
Rules for classification: 1) Points; 2) Points difference; 3) Points scored.

9 October 2025
18:00

Boxscore

MB Zagłębie Sosnowiec (Poland)	86–69	(Czech Republic) SBŠ Ostrava
Scoring by quarter: 17–20, 17–17, 36–12, 16–20
Pts: Reese 22; Rebs: Reese 15; Asts: Tadić 9		Pts: Belosevic, Nelson 15; Rebs: Belosevic 11; Asts: Halatkova 6

Hala Widowiskowo-Sportowa, Sosnowiec
Attendance: 150
Referees: Skirmantas Letukas (DEN), Rúben Györfy (HUN), Stefan Zdravkovic (SRB)

9 October 2025
20:30

Boxscore

SL Benfica (Portugal)	55–64	(Spain) Baxi Ferrol
Scoring by quarter: 14–17, 15–16, 18–19, 8–12
Pts: Puc 14; Rebs: Puc 9 Asts: Soeiro 5		Pts: Millan 19; Rebs: Daniels, Sanchez 9 Asts: Melia 5

Pavilhão Fidelidade, Lisbon
Attendance: 234
Referees: Petr Blahout (CZE), Tom de Lange (BEL), Jakub Izak (SVK)

15 October 2025
18:00

Boxscore

MB Zagłębie Sosnowiec (Poland)	73–63	(Portugal) SL Benfica
Scoring by quarter: 21–11, 23–11, 12–22, 17–19
Pts: Reese 18; Rebs: Reese 13; Asts: Tadić 10		Pts: Puc 13; Rebs: Puc 21; Asts: Soeiro 5

Hala Widowiskowo-Sportowa, Sosnowiec
Attendance: 200
Referees: Mart Uuehendrik (EST), Indrė Balnionytė-Gecevičienė (LTU), Milita Stalaucinskaite (LTU)

15 October 2025
20:15

Boxscore

Baxi Ferrol (Spain)	100–64	(Czech Republic) SBŠ Ostrava
Scoring by quarter: 19–17, 28–18, 25–16, 28–13
Pts: Daniels 19; Rebs: Millan 9 Asts: Melia 8		Pts: Squires 16; Rebs: Belosevic 6 Asts: Squires 4

Polideportivo A Malata, Ferrol
Attendance: 1,412
Referees: Jules Gaduel (FRA), Jurgen Muho (LUX), Pierre Gilis (BEL)

22 October 2025
18:00

Boxscore

MB Zagłębie Sosnowiec (Poland)	83–90	(Spain) Baxi Ferrol
Scoring by quarter: 19–25, 24–22, 19–21, 21–22
Pts: Taylor 27; Rebs: Tadić, Reese 8 Asts: Tadić 12		Pts: Daniels 18; Rebs: Melia 9 Asts: three players 4

Hala Widowiskowo-Sportowa, Sosnowiec
Attendance: 250
Referees: Ivo Kitsing (EST), Rafiks Misirovs (LAT), Andžej Urbanovič (LTU)

23 October 2025
18:30

Boxscore

SL Benfica (Portugal)	81–85 (OT)	(Czech Republic) SBŠ Ostrava
Scoring by quarter: 25–23, 11–14, 24–10, 12–25, Overtime: 9–13
Pts: Soares 21; Rebs: Bettencourt 9 Asts: Soeiro 8		Pts: Belošević 20; Rebs: Belošević 11; Asts: Kubíčková 7

Pavilhão Fidelidade, Lisbon
Attendance: 61
Referees: Giacomo Dori (ITA), Pierre Landy (FRA), Tom DeHondt (BEL)

29 October 2025
19:15

Boxscore

SBŠ Ostrava (Czech Republic)	69–76	(Poland) MB Zagłębie Sosnowiec
Scoring by quarter: 16–20, 16–13, 17–18, 20–25
Pts: Squires 22; Rebs: Belošević, Vacková 10; Asts: Squires, Valková 4		Pts: Taylor 28; Rebs: Reese 16; Asts: Tadić 11

City Campus, Ostrava
Attendance: 138
Referees: Frane Mjeda (CRO), Dovydas Kairys (LTU), Stefan Zdravković (SRB)

29 October 2025
20:15

Boxscore

Baxi Ferrol (Spain)	109–58	(Portugal) SL Benfica
Scoring by quarter: 24–6, 26–12, 30–23, 29–17
Pts: Daniels 19; Rebs: Millán 7 Asts: four players 4		Pts: Afonso 8 Rebs: Puc, Soares 5 Asts: Soares 3

Polideportivo A Malata, Ferrol
Attendance: 1,413
Referees: Oleksandr Dotsenko (LUX), Gavin Williams (GBR), Julien Malané (LUX)

5 November 2025
17:00

Boxscore

SL Benfica (Portugal)	65–66	(Poland) MB Zagłębie Sosnowiec
Scoring by quarter: 13–26, 14–16, 20–11, 18–13
Pts: Soares 17; Rebs: Puc, Soares 12; Asts: Faustino 5		Pts: Taylor 18; Rebs: Taylor 8 Asts: Tadić 7

Pavilhão Fidelidade, Lisbon
Attendance: 34
Referees: James Kerry Dominique (GIB), Tom DeHondt (BEL), Andrea Valzani (ITA)

5 November 2025
19:15

Boxscore

SBŠ Ostrava (Czech Republic)	64–98	(Spain) Baxi Ferrol
Scoring by quarter: 26–15, 14–30, 16–32, 8–21
Pts: Belošević 15; Rebs: Ewodo 9 Asts: Nelson 5		Pts: Sánchez-Ramos, Šotolová 18; Rebs: Daniels 9 Asts: Erjavec 7

City Campus, Ostrava
Attendance: 150
Referees: Gabrielius Simonavičius (LTU), Marija Ćirić (SRB), Tolga Akkuşoğlu (TUR)

26 November 2025
19:15

Boxscore

SBŠ Ostrava (Czech Republic)	85–52	(Portugal) SL Benfica
Scoring by quarter: 18–13, 23–8, 15–15, 29–16
Pts: Belošević, Squires 15; Rebs: Belošević, Ewodo 10; Asts: Squires, Valkova 4		Pts: Soares 13; Rebs: Rodrigues 8 Asts: Soeiro 4

City Campus, Ostrava
Attendance: 123
Referees: Laure Coanus (FRA), Eirini Margarita Tsantali (GRE), Viktor Jankovics (HUN)

26 November 2025
20:15

Boxscore

Baxi Ferrol (Spain)	92–49	(Poland) MB Zagłębie Sosnowiec
Scoring by quarter: 24–12, 27–12, 16–11, 25–14
Pts: Šotolová 21; Rebs: Millán, Daniels 7 Asts: Sánchez-Ramos 5		Pts: Reese 17; Rebs: Reese 8 Asts: Tadić 6

Polideportivo A Malata, Ferrol
Attendance: 1,218
Referees: Ali Şakacı (TUR), Jule Gaduel (FRA), Skirmantas Letukas (DEN)

=== Group L ===
Pos	Team	Pld	W	L	PF	PA	PD	Pts	Qualification	VIL	SLE	FRI	BER
1	(France) Villeneuve-d'Ascq LM	6	5	1	498	353	+145	11	Play-off Round 1	—	73–50	75–48	111–49
2	(Poland) Ślęza Wrocław	6	4	2	505	419	+86	10	Play-off Round 1	70–78	—	90–65	100–63
3	(Switzerland) BCF Elfic Fribourg	6	3	3	424	465	−41	9		75–68	74–96	—	78–74
4	(Bulgaria) Beroe Stara Zagora	6	0	6	375	565	−190	6		61–93	66–99	62–84	—

Source: EuroCup Women
Rules for classification: 1) Points; 2) Points difference; 3) Points scored.

8 October 2025
19:30

Boxscore

BCF Elfic Fribourg (Switzerland)	75–68	(France) Villeneuve-d'Ascq LM
Scoring by quarter: 17–21, 17–20, 16–13, 25–14
Pts: Love 20; Rebs: Love 8 Asts: Mitrashinovikj 8		Pts: Fall 23; Rebs: Tahane 9 Asts: four players 3

Site Sportif Saint-Leonard, Fribourg
Attendance: 350
Referees: Dennis Sirowi (GER), Irene Frosolini (ITA), Teo Miletić (CRO)

9 October 2025
18:00

Boxscore

Ślęza Wrocław (Poland)	100–63	(Bulgaria) Beroe Stara Zagora
Scoring by quarter: 30–10, 18–21, 34–10, 18–22
Pts: Strautmane 15; Rebs: Davis 8 Asts: Vihmane 7		Pts: Cooper 18; Rebs: Petrova 8 Asts: Madankova 6

KGHM Ślęza Arena, Wrocław
Attendance: 750
Referees: Indrė Balnionytė-Gecevičienė (LTU), Milita Stalaucinskaite (LTU), Kristine Simanovica (LAT)

15 October 2025
18:00

Boxscore

Ślęza Wrocław (Poland)	70–78	(France) Villeneuve-d'Ascq LM
Scoring by quarter: 22–10, 19–27, 15–19, 14–22
Pts: Davis 18; Rebs: Davis 10; Asts: Kraker 8		Pts: Peterson 19; Rebs: Tahane 8 Asts: Paget, Peterson 4

KGHM Ślęza Arena, Wrocław
Attendance: 850
Referees: Andžej Urbanovič (LTU), Einars Tukiss (LAT), Kristine Simanovica (LAT)

16 October 2025
19:00

Boxscore

Beroe Stara Zagora (Bulgaria)	62–84	(Switzerland) BCF Elfic Fribourg
Scoring by quarter: 13–22, 23–19, 8–26, 18–17
Pts: Elliott, Vasileva 12; Rebs: Vasileva 8 Asts: Madankova 4		Pts: Love 28; Rebs: Love 14; Asts: Mitrashinovikj 8

Obshtinska Municipal Hall, Stara Zagora
Attendance: 450
Referees: Vlad-Theodor Cotrobas-Dascalu (ROU), Andras Mate Stretea (ROU), Nemanja Vlahovic (SRB)

23 October 2025
19:00

Boxscore

Beroe Stara Zagora (Bulgaria)	61–93	(France) Villeneuve-d'Ascq LM
Scoring by quarter: 19–21, 9–25, 17–25, 16–22
Pts: Vasileva, Stoyanovska 10; Rebs: Cooper 10; Asts: Madankova, Stoyanovska 3		Pts: Peterson 17; Rebs: Milapie 10; Asts: Páleníková 5

Obshtinska Municipal Hall, Stara Zagora
Attendance: 450
Referees: Haris Bijedic (BIH), Nikolaos Skandalakis (GRE), Marija Ćirić (SRB)

23 October 2025
19:30

Boxscore

BCF Elfic Fribourg (Switzerland)	75–96	(Poland) Ślęza Wrocław
Scoring by quarter: 19–21, 17–19, 15–31, 23–25
Pts: Love 25; Rebs: Love 11; Asts: Mitrashinovikj 7		Pts: Davis 23; Rebs: Davis 9 Asts: Fiszer 10

Site Sportif Saint-Leonard, Fribourg
Attendance: 620
Referees: Iyán González Gálvez (ESP), Lauri Jäämaa (FIN), Elldin Uglari (KOS)

29 October 2025
20:00

Boxscore

Villeneuve-d'Ascq LM (France)	75–48	(Switzerland) BCF Elfic Fribourg
Scoring by quarter: 18–15, 16–13, 20–16, 21–4
Pts: Peterson 18; Rebs: Tahane 7 Asts: three players 3		Pts: Mitrashinovikj 16; Rebs: Love 9 Asts: Love, Clouden 2

Le Palacium, Villeneuve-d'Ascq
Attendance: 1,950
Referees: Vicente Martínez Silla (ESP), Igor Esteve Malmierca (AND), Doğu Berk İnnal (GER)

30 October 2025
19:00

Boxscore

Beroe Stara Zagora (Bulgaria)	66–99	(Poland) Ślęza Wrocław
Scoring by quarter: 16–37, 16–28, 17–18, 17–16
Pts: Cooper 17; Rebs: Cooper 9 Asts: Stoyanovska 5		Pts: Kraker 21; Rebs: Davis 11; Asts: Fiszer 8

Obshtinska Municipal Hall, Stara Zagora
Attendance: 350
Referees: Alija Ferevski (MKD), Luka Manojlović, (SRB), Andrej Zlatevski (MKD)

5 November 2025
19:30

Boxscore

BCF Elfic Fribourg (Switzerland)	78–74	(Bulgaria) Beroe Stara Zagora
Scoring by quarter: 14–14, 27–19, 15–22, 22–19
Pts: Clouden 27; Rebs: Love 19; Asts: Mitrashinovikj 8		Pts: Elliott 38; Rebs: Elliott 13; Asts: Madankova 6

Site Sportif Saint-Leonard, Fribourg
Attendance: 330
Referees: Sandra Sánchez (ESP), Irene Frossolini (ITA), Azra Mušić (SLO)

5 November 2025
20:00

Boxscore

Villeneuve-d'Ascq LM (France)	73–50	(Poland) Ślęza Wrocław
Scoring by quarter: 19–8, 21–16, 21–11, 12–15
Pts: Alston 25; Rebs: Tahane 10; Asts: Peterson 4		Pts: Davis 14; Rebs: Davis 9 Asts: Fiszer 3

Le Palacium, Villeneuve-d'Ascq
Attendance: 1,986
Referees: Tiago Roxo Perdigão (POR), Jakub Izal (SVK), Tom de Lange (BEL)

26 November 2025
20:00

Boxscore

Villeneuve-d'Ascq LM (France)	111–49	(Bulgaria) Beroe Stara Zagora
Scoring by quarter: 38–14, 23–9, 24–17, 26–9
Pts: Kouadio 18; Rebs: Chery 12; Asts: Tahane 8		Pts: Aleksieva 18; Rebs: Aleksieva 6 Asts: Madankova, Aleksieva 3

Le Palacium, Villeneuve-d'Ascq
Attendance: 1,950
Referees: Jurgen Muho (LUX), Petr Blahout (CZE), David Andrew Griffin (GBR)

27 November 2025
18:00

Boxscore

Ślęza Wrocław (Poland)	90–65	(Switzerland) BCF Elfic Fribourg
Scoring by quarter: 18–26, 25–10, 26–16, 21–13
Pts: Kulińska 18; Rebs: Strautmane 8 Asts: Kulińska, Fiszer 5		Pts: Clouden 29; Rebs: Clouden 8 Asts: Clouden 5

KGHM Ślęza Arena, Wrocław
Attendance: 700
Referees: Nikola Perlic (CRO), Elias Anttonen (FIN), Andžej Urbanovič (LTU)

=== Ranking of third place teams ===
Pos	Grp	Team	Pld	W	L	PF	PA	PD	Pts	Qualification
1	A	(Basketball Belgium) Castors Braine	6	4	2	443	397	+46	10	Play-off Round 1
2	J	(Turkish Basketball Federation) Beşiktaş Boa	6	3	3	499	479	+20	9	Play-off Round 1
3	C	(Israeli Basketball Association) Elitzur Ramla	6	3	3	413	405	+8	9	Play-off Round 1
4	I	(Romanian Basketball Federation) CS Rapid București	6	3	3	425	422	+3	9	Play-off Round 1
5	D	(Hungarian Basketball Federation) TARR KSC Szekszárd	6	3	3	433	434	−1	9	
6	L	(Swiss Basketball) BCF Elfic Fribourg	6	3	3	424	465	−41	9	
7	E	(Latvian Basketball Association) TTT Riga	6	2	4	402	453	−51	8	
8	G	(Lithuanian Basketball Federation) BC Neptūnas-Amberton	6	2	4	432	487	−55	8	
9	K	(Czech Basketball Federation) SBŠ Ostrava	6	2	4	436	493	−57	8	
10	B	(Basketball Federation of Serbia) UŽKK Student	6	2	4	410	501	−91	8	
11	H	(Italian Basketball Federation) BDS Dinamo Sassari	6	2	4	353	385	−32	7	
12	F	(Basketball Federation of Kosovo) KBF Peja 03	6	1	5	396	517	−121	7	

Source: FIBA
Rules for classification: 1) Points; 2) Points difference; 3) Points scored.

== Notes ==
Reference
Matchday 1 Wed
Matchday 2 Thu
Matchday 2 Wed
Matchday 2 Thu
Matchday 3 Wed
Matchday 3 Thu
Matchday 4 Wed
Matchday 4 Thu
Matchday 5
Matchday 6 Wed
Matchday 6 Thu

== See also ==
- 2025–26 EuroLeague Women
- 2025–26 EuroCup Women
- 2025 FIBA Europe SuperCup Women
- 2025–26 EuroLeague Women regular season
- 2025–26 EuroLeague Women qualification round
- 2025–26 EuroCup Women qualification round
- 2025–26 EuroCup Basketball
