= 2025–26 EuroLeague Women qualification round =

EuroLeague Women qualification round
- Season: 2025–26
- Dates: 17–24 September 2025
- Games played: 10
- Teams: 10 (from 10 countries)

The 2025–26 EuroLeague Women qualification round decided the final five teams in the regular season.

== Format ==
Ten teams were divided into five play offs, where the winners on aggregate advanced to the regular season.

== Teams ==
Location of teams of the 2025–26 EuroLeague Women qualification round.
Orange: Play Off 1; Green: Play Off 2; Brown: Play Off 3; Blue: Play Off 4; Yellow: Play Off 5.

Teams
(Czech Republic) Žabiny Brno
(France) Tango Bourges Basket
(Hungary) DVTK HUN-Therm
(Italy) Umana Reyer Venezia
(Lithuania) Kibirkštis-TOKS
(Poland) AZS UMCS Lublin
(Romania) ACS Sepsi SIC
(Serbia) KKZ Crvena zvezda
(Spain) Casademont Zaragoza
(Turkey) Galatasaray Cagdas Faktoring

== Draw ==
External videos
- Draw

The draw took place at 10:00 CET in Munich, Germany on 23 July 2025. The bold text means which teams advanced.

Seeded	Unseeded
(Turkey) **Galatasaray Cagdas Faktoring** (France) **Tango Bourges Basket** (Spain) **Casademont Zaragoza** (Italy) **Umana Reyer Venezia** (Hungary) **DVTK HUN-Therm**	(Czech Republic) Žabiny Brno (Poland) AZS UMCS Lublin (Romania) ACS Sepsi SIC (Lithuania) Kibirkštis-TOKS (Serbia) KKZ Crvena zvezda

== Matches ==
The five winners on aggregate advanced to the regular season.

Team 1	Agg.	Team 2	1st leg	2nd leg
**Casademont Zaragoza** (Spain)	**142**–140	(Czech Republic) Žabiny Brno	60–81	82–59
**Umana Reyer Venezia** (Italy)	**149**–134	(Serbia) KKZ Crvena zvezda	79–71	70–63
**Galatasaray Cagdas Faktoring** (Turkey)	**164**–94	(Romania) ACS Sepsi SIC	81–48	86–46
**DVTK HUN-Therm** (Hungary)	**144**–129	(Poland) AZS UMCS Lublin	67–70	77–59
**Tango Bourges Basket** (France)	**153**–134	(Lithuania) Kibirkštis-TOKS	64–75	89–59

All times are local.

18 September 2025
18:00

Boxscore

**Žabiny Brno** (Czech Republic)	**81**–60	(Spain) Casademont Zaragoza
Scoring by quarter: **22**–8, **29**–11, 16–**22**, 14–**19**
Pts: Juškaitė 22; Rebs: Spanou 9 Asts: Záplatová 5		Pts: Fingall 16; Rebs: Bankole 7 Asts: Ortiz 6

Sportovní hala Vodova Brno
Attendance: 1,215
Referees: Silvia Marizali (ITA), Ivana Ivanovic (SRB), Jelena Tomic (CRO)

24 September 2025
20:00

Boxscore

**Casademont Zaragoza** (Spain)	**82**–59	(Czech Republic) Žabiny Brno
Scoring by quarter: **26**–17, 12–**15**, **17**–11, **27**–16
Pts: Ortiz 26; Rebs: Fingall 7 Asts: Ortiz 8		Pts: Toure 15; Rebs: Juškaitė 11; Asts: four players 2

Pabellón Príncipe Felipe, Zaragoza
Attendance: 5,831
Referees: Sonia Texeira (POR), Amal Dahra (FRA), Edgard Ceccarelli (FRA)

Casademont Zaragoza won 142–140 on aggregate

17 September 2025
16:30

Boxscore

KKZ Crvena zvezda (Serbia)	71–**79**	(Italy) **Umana Reyer Venezia**
Scoring by quarter: 21–21, **18**–14, 16–**17**, 16–**27**
Pts: Anderson 20; Rebs: Anderson 8 Asts: Anderson 6		Pts: Mavunga 16; Rebs: Mavunga 9 Asts: three players 4

Ranko Žeravica Sports Hall, Belgrade
Attendance: 1,500
Referees: Veronika Obertova (SVK), Amalia Marchis (ROU), Ritvars Helmsteins (LAT)

24 September 2025
19:30

Boxscore

**Umana Reyer Venezia** (Italy)	**70**–63	(Serbia) KKZ Crvena zvezda
Scoring by quarter: 13–**20**, **17**–11, **19**–18, **21**–14
Pts: Santucci 17; Rebs: Mavunga 9 Asts: Pasa 8		Pts: Djordjevic 21; Rebs: Hillsman 13; Asts: Lisowa Mbaka 5

Palasport Taliercio, Venezia
Attendance: 1,496
Referees: Paulina Karolina Gajdosz (POL), Yasmina Alcaraz (ESP), Tolga Edis (TUR)

Umana Reyer Venezia won 149–134 on aggregate

17 September 2025
19:00

Boxscore

ACS Sepsi SIC (Romania)	48–**81**	(Turkey) **Galatasaray Cagdas Faktoring**
Scoring by quarter: 11–**26**, 11–**16**, 13–**18**, 13–**21**
Pts: Meresz 13; Rebs: Meresz 7 Asts: Davis 7		Pts: Juhász 15; Rebs: Kuier, Juhász 10; Asts: Juhász, Smalls 6

Sala Sporturilor Szabo Kati, Sfântu Gheorghe
Attendance: 1,000
Referees: Branimir Galic (CRO), Natasa Drgaojevic (MNE), Ioannis Agrafiotis (GRE)

24 September 2025
20:00

Boxscore

**Galatasaray Cagdas Faktoring** (Turkey)	**86**–46	(Romania) ACS Sepsi SIC
Scoring by quarter: **19**–10, **28**–8, **18**–11, **21**–17
Pts: Kuier 19; Rebs: Juhász 12; Asts: Oblak 7		Pts: Gereben 12; Rebs: Gereben 5 Asts: Diop, Szabo 3

Basketball Development Centre, Istanbul
Attendance: 600
Referees: Veronika Obertova (SVK), Jelena Tomic (CRO), Hrvoje Cavar (BIH)

Galatasaray Cagdas Faktoring won 167–94 on aggregate

18 September 2025
19:00

Boxscore

**AZS UMCS Lublin** (Poland)	**70**–67	(Hungary) DVTK HUN-Therm
Scoring by quarter: **21**–13, 17–**19**, 12–**19**, **20**–16
Pts: Slocum 17; Rebs: Gil 10; Asts: Ryan, Slocum 3		Pts: Ginzo, 15; Rebs: three players 5 Asts: Aho 6

Hala Mosir, Lublin
Attendance: 834
Referees: Viola Gyorgyi (NOR), Jan Baloun (CZE), Armin Mutapcic (GER)

24 September 2025
18:00

Boxscore

**DVTK HUN-Therm** (Hungary)	**77**–59	(Poland) AZS UMCS Lublin
Scoring by quarter: **28**–24, **25**–13, 8–**11**, **16**–11
Pts: Lelik 18; Rebs: Grigalauskyte 9 Asts: Aho 4		Pts: Gil 15; Rebs: Gil 9 Asts: Gil 7

DVTK Arena, Miskolc
Attendance: 2,000
Referees: Marek Kukelcik (SVK), Nataša Dragojević (MNE), Branimir Galic (CRO)

DVTK HUN-Therm won 144–129 on aggregate

18 September 2025
17:00

Boxscore

**Kibirkštis-TOKS** (Lithuania)	**75**–64	(France) Tango Bourges Basket
Scoring by quarter: 18–18, **21**–17, 11–**18**, **25**–11
Pts: Nacickaitė-Van Der Horst 25; Rebs: Labuckiene 11; Asts: Nacickaitė-Van Der Horst 5		Pts: Diaby, Foppossi 16; Rebs: Diaby, Tabdi 9 Asts: Duchet, Guapo 4

Active Vilnius Arena, Vilnius
Attendance: 1,087
Referees: Paulina Karolina Gajdosz (POL), Rainis Värv (EST), Elvis Binders-Coders (LAT)

24 September 2025
20:00

Boxscore

**Tango Bourges Basket** (France)	**89**–59	(Lithuania) Kibirkštis-TOKS
Scoring by quarter: **32**–14, **22**–20, **19**–6, 16–**19**
Pts: Tabdi 26; Rebs: Guapo, Pouye 7 Asts: Duchet 6		Pts: Dean 21; Rebs: Labuckiene 7 Asts: Nacickaitė-Van Der Horst, Radic 2

Palais des sports du Prado, Bourges
Attendance: 3,000
Referees: Silvia Marziali (ITA), Esperanza Mendoza (ESP), Geert Jacobs (BEL)

Tango Bourges Basket won 153–134 on aggregate

== See also ==
- 2025–26 EuroLeague Women
- 2025–26 EuroLeague Women regular season
- 2025–26 EuroCup Women
- 2025–26 EuroCup Women regular season
- 2025–26 EuroCup Women knockout stage
- 2025 FIBA Europe SuperCup Women
- 2025–26 EuroCup Women qualification round

Reference
First leg
Second leg
