= 2025 FIBA Europe SuperCup Women =

Supercup

Tournament details
- Arena: Le Palacium; Villeneuve-d'Ascq, France
- Dates: 1 October 2025

Final positions
- Champions: ZVVZ USK Praha
- Runners-up: ESB Villeneuve-d'Ascq

Awards and statistics
- MVP: Pauline Astier
- Top scorer(s): Pauline Astier, Valériane Ayayi
- Attendance: 2,100

The 2025 FIBA Europe SuperCup Women was the 14th edition of the FIBA Europe SuperCup Women. It was held on 1 October 2025, at the Le Palacium in Villeneuve-d'Ascq between ZVVZ USK Praha and ESB Villeneuve-d'Ascq.

== Teams ==
Team	Qualification	Previous participation (bold indicates winners)
(Czech Republic) ZVVZ USK Praha	Winners of the 2024–25 EuroLeague Women	**2015**
(France) ESB Villeneuve-d'Ascq	Winners up of the 2024–25 EuroCup Women	2015, 2016

== Venue ==
The Le Palacium in Villeneuve-d'Ascq hosted the match

Villeneuve-d'Ascq
Le Palacium
Capacity:2,300
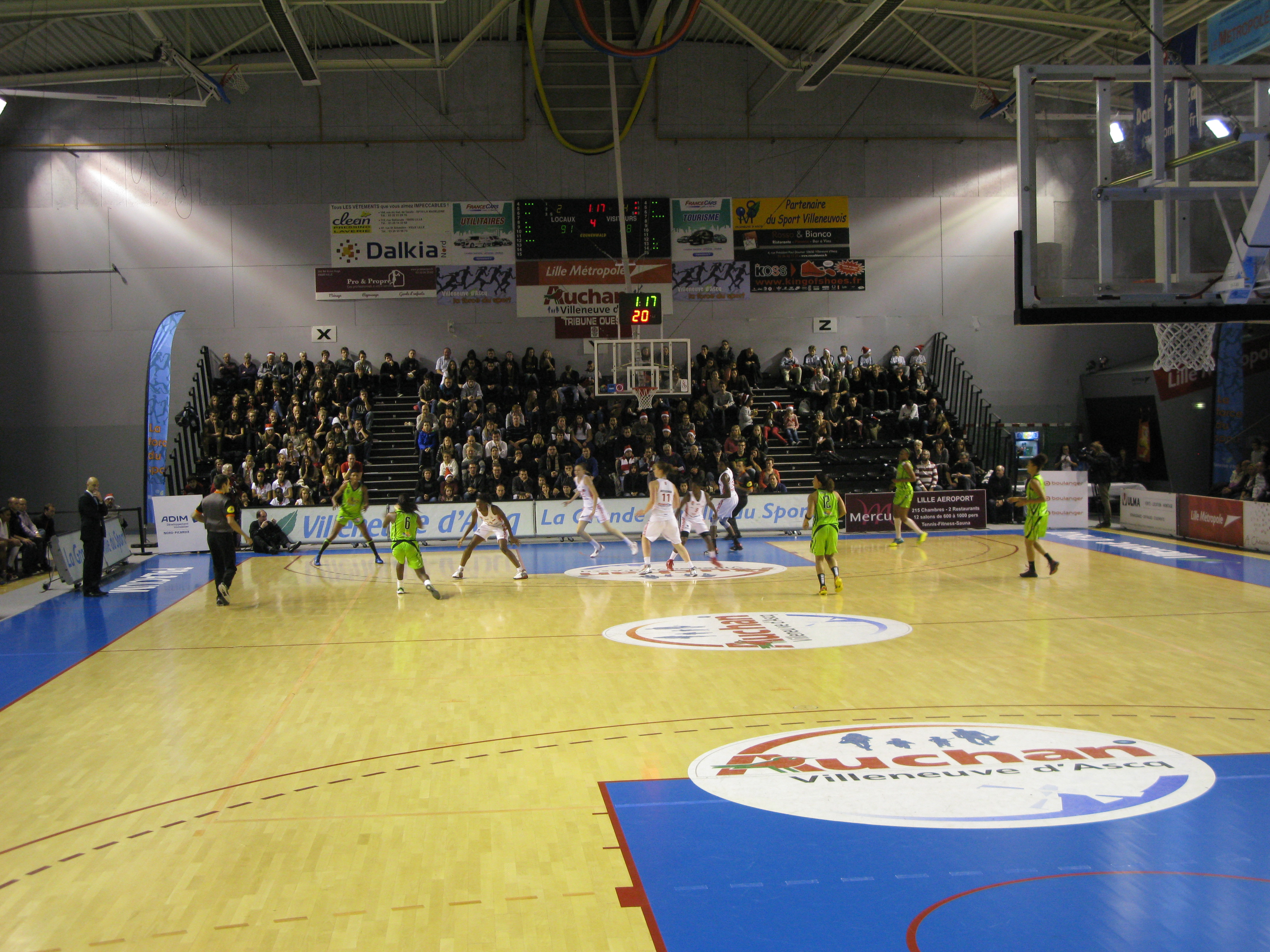

== Final ==
1 October 2025
20:30 (CEST)

Boxscore

ESB Villeneuve-d'Ascq (France)	77–**86**	(Czech Republic) ZVVZ USK Praha
Scoring by quarter: 13–**20**, 19–**23**, 24–**26**, **21**–17
Pts: Alston 16; Rebs: Fall 8 Asts: Paget, Tahane 4		Pts: Astier, Ayayi 17; Rebs: Čechová, Salaün 6 Asts: Astier 15

Le Palacium, Villeneuve-d'Ascq
Attendance: 2,100
Referees: Çisil Güngör (TUR), Silvia Marziali (ITA), Ivana Ivanović (SRB)

Starters:			Pts	Reb	Ast
PG	22	(United States) Ameryst Alston	16	2	2
SG	74	(France) Marie-Ève Paget	6	2	4
SF	31	(France) Emmanuelle Tahane	13	4	4
PF	69	(Senegal) Sokhna Fall	7	8	0
C	13	(France) Marie Michelle Milapie	3	3	2
Reserves:					
SG	1	(Germany) Alexis Peterson	11	3	3
SG	5	(France) Naëma Aya Kouadio	0	1	0
PG	7	(France) Jade Ndembo	DNP		
SG	12	(France) Alexia Chartereau	8	2	1
G	27	(France) Lise Fangnigbe	DNP		
SG	30	(France) Olivia Yale	0	0	0
SF	33	(Slovakia) Terézia Páleníková	13	2	1
Head coach:
(French Federation of Basketball) Maxime Bézin

**ESBVA-LM**	**Praha**

ESBVA-LM	Statistics	Praha
14/30 (46.7%)	2-pt field goals	26/43 (60.5%)
11/22 (50%)	3-pt field goals	7/19 (36.8%)
16/20 (80%)	Free throws	13/17 (76.5%)
10	Offensive rebounds	13
19	Defensive rebounds	20
29	Total rebounds	33
17	Assists	23
25	Turnovers	17
10	Steals	17
0	Blocks	3
20	Fouls	19

2025 FIBA Europe SuperCup Women winner

ZVVZ USK Praha
2nd SuperCup Women title

Starters:			Pts	Reb	Ast
PG	7	(Czech Republic) Petra Malíková	14	4	1
SG	18	(France) Pauline Astier	17	2	15
SF	1	(Czech Republic) Mariana Přibylová	7	0	2
PF	11	(France) Valériane Ayayi	17	5	4
C	22	(Czech Republic) Emma Čechová	6	6	1
Reserves:					
SF	2	(Czech Republic) Karolína Petlánová	DNP		
SG	8	(Czech Republic) Eliška Javanská	DNP		
SG	13	(France) Janelle Salaün	9	6	0
SF	14	(Netherlands) Emese Hof	16	5	0
SF	15	(Czech Republic) Viktorie Štaflová	DNP		
Head coach:
(Czech Basketball Federation) Martin Bašta

== See also ==
- 2025–26 EuroLeague Women
- 2025–26 EuroCup Women
- 2025–26 EuroLeague Women regular season
- 2025–26 EuroLeague Women qualification round
- 2025–26 EuroCup Women regular season
- 2025–26 EuroCup Women qualification round
- 2025–26 EuroCup Women knockout stage
