= 2025–26 EuroCup Women qualification round =

EuroCup Women qualification round
- Season: 2025–26
- Dates: 18–25 September 2025
- Games played: 10
- Teams: 10 (from 8 countries)

The 2025–26 EuroCup Women qualification round decided the final five teams in the regular season.

== Format ==
Ten teams were divided into five play offs, where the winners on aggregate advanced to the regular season.

== Teams ==
Location of teams of the 2025–26 EuroCup Women qualification round.
Orange: Play Off 1; Green: Play Off 2; Brown: Play Off 3; Blue: Play Off 4; Yellow: Play Off 5.

Teams
(Czech Republic) SBŠ Ostrava
(Czech Republic) DSK Basketball Brandys
(Greece) Panathlitikos Sykeon
(Greece) Pas Giannina
(Hungary) TARR KSC Szekszárd
(Italy) BDS Dinamo Sassari
(Romania) CS Universitatea Cluj
(Serbia) UZKK Student
(Spain) Lointek Gernika Bizkaia
(Switzerland) BBC Troistorrents-Chablais

== Draw ==
External videos
- Draw

The draw took place at 10:00 CET in Munich, Germany on 23 July 2025. The bold text means which teams advanced.

Seeded	Unseeded
(Spain) **Lointek Gernika Bizkaia** (Italy) **BDS Dinamo Sassari** (Hungary) **TARR KSC Szekszárd** (Romania) CS Universitatea Cluj (Czech Republic) **SBŠ Ostrava**	(Czech Republic) DSK Basketball Brandys (Greece) Panathlitikos Sykeon (Greece) Pas Giannina (Switzerland) BBC Troistorrents-Chablais (Serbia) **UZKK Student**

== Matches ==
The three winners on aggregate advanced to the regular season.

Team 1	Agg.	Team 2	1st leg	2nd leg
CS Universitatea Cluj (Romania)	151–**174**	(Serbia) **UZKK Student**	78–93	73–81
**Lointek Gernika Bizkaia** (Spain)	**184**–118	(Greece) Pas Giannina	90–57	94–61
**BDS Dinamo Sassari** (Italy)	**138**–118	(Greece) Panathlitikos Sykeon	72–56	66–62
**SBŠ Ostrava** (Czech Republic)	**167**–129	(Switzerland) BBC Troistorrents-Chablais	65–65	102–64
**TARR KSC Szekszárd** (Hungary)	**165**–124	(Czech Republic) DSK Basketball Brandys	81–69	84–59

All times are local.

18 September 2025
19:00

Boxscore

**UZKK Student** (Serbia)	**93**–78	(Romania) CS Universitatea Cluj
Scoring by quarter: **26**–19, 18–**27**, **21**–14, **28**–18
Pts: Tesic 26; Rebs: Briggs 10; Asts: Marjanovic 10		Pts: Taylor 21; Rebs: Taylor 13; Asts: David 8

Čair Sports Center, Niš
Attendance: 500
Referees: Zoran Mitrovski (MKD), Svetlana Stoyanova (BUL), Stylianos Simeonidis (GRE)

25 September 2025
18:00

Boxscore

CS Universitatea Cluj (Romania)	73–**81**	(Serbia) **UZKK Student**
Scoring by quarter: **22**–12, **14**–12, 17–**30**, 20–**27**
Pts: Taylor 21; Rebs: Taylor 15; Asts: David 4		Pts: Nedeljkov 22; Rebs: Vuckovic 8 Asts: Corto 4

BTarena, Cluj-Napoca
Attendance: 450
Referees: Balazs Meszaros (HUN), Nikolao Tziopanos (GRE), Dumitru Stasiev (MDA)

UZKK Student won 174–151 on aggregate

18 September 2025
20:30

Boxscore

Pas Giannina (Greece)	57–**90**	(Spain) **Lointek Gernika Bizkaia**
Scoring by quarter: 12–**26**, 17–**28**, 12–**21**, **16**–15
Pts: Sarigiannidou 18; Rebs: Singleton 5 Asts: Marini 8		Pts: Salvadores 19; Rebs: Bessoir 10; Asts: Salvadores 11

Neo Kleisto Ioanninon, Ioannina
Attendance: 550
Referees: Alija Ferevski (MKD), Gilbert Hoxha (ALB), Suzana Vujicic (MNE)

24 September 2025
20:30

Boxscore

**Lointek Gernika Bizkaia** (Spain)	**94**–61	(Greece) Pas Giannina
Scoring by quarter: **23**–12, **28**–23, **19**–12, **24**–14
Pts: Jankovic, Polleros 16; Rebs: Polleros 7 Asts: Westerik 9		Pts: Sarigiannidou 116; Rebs: Singleton 12; Asts: Morehouse 6

Polideportivo Maloste, Gernika
Attendance: 308
Referees: Martin van Hoye (BEL), Oleksandr Dotsenko (LUX), Tijmen Last (NED)

Lointek Gernika Bizkaia won 184–118 on aggregate

18 September 2025
20:15

Boxscore

Panathlitikos Sykeon (Greece)	56–**72**	(Italy) **BDS Dinamo Sassari**
Scoring by quarter: 13–**17**, 9–**16**, 18–**19**, 16–**20**
Pts: Ransom 24; Rebs: Alexandri 8 Asts: Alexandri 5		Pts: Treffers 18; Rebs: Richards, Spinelli 10; Asts: Carangelo 8

(Nick Galis Hall), Thessaloniki
Attendance: 200
Referees: Nemanja Ninkovic (SRB), Vladimir Zanev (BUL), Ori Shalhavi (ISR)

24 September 2025
20:30

Boxscore

**BDS Dinamo Sassari** (Italy)	**66**–62	(Greece) Panathlitikos Sykeon
Scoring by quarter: **23**–16, **20**–17, **12**–6, 11–**23**
Pts: Poindexter, Richards 12; Rebs: Treffers 13; Asts: Carangelo 5		Pts: James 14; Rebs: James 9 Asts: Alexandri 5

PalaSerradimigni, Sassari
Attendance: 410
Referees: Nikola Perlic (CRO), Maria Ignatiou (CYP), Domen Krajnc (SLO)

BDS Dinamo Sassari won 138–118 on aggregate

18 September 2025
20:00

Boxscore

BBC Troistorrents-Chablais (Switzerland)	65–65	(Czech Republic) SBŠ Ostrava
Scoring by quarter: **15**–12, 16–**27**, **21**–15, **13**–11
Pts: Ivanusa 15; Rebs: Ivanusa 11; Asts: three players 3		Pts: Belosevic 16; Rebs: Belosevic 11; Asts: Valkova 6

Reposieux, Monthey
Attendance: 450
Referees: Amal Dahra (FRA), Valerio Grigioni (ITA), Laure Coanus (FRA)

25 September 2025
19:30

Boxscore

**SBŠ Ostrava** (Czech Republic)	**102**–64	(Switzerland) BBC Troistorrents-Chablais
Scoring by quarter: **30**–18, 21–**22**, **28**–13, **23**–11
Pts: Halatkova 18; Rebs: Ewodo 10; Asts: Kubickova 7		Pts: Ivanusa 17; Rebs: Ivanusa 11; Asts: Bourhani, Ivanusa 4

City Campus, Ostrava
Attendance: 600
Referees: Lukasz Jankowski (POL), Viktor Nagy (HUN), Goran Grbić (SLO)

SBŠ Ostrava won 167–129 on aggregate

18 September 2025
19:00

Boxscore

DSK Basketball Brandys (Czech Republic)	69–**81**	(Hungary) **TARR KSC Szekszárd**
Scoring by quarter: **19**–16, **19**–17, 16–**30**, 15–**18**
Pts: Hanusova 21; Rebs: Hanusova 10; Asts: Liskova 4		Pts: Dombai 30; Rebs: Karlen 10; Asts: Rodrigues, Alexandra Theodorean 3

Sportovni Hala Rokytka, Prague
Attendance: 200
Referees: Peter Zenis (SVK), Ewa Matuszewska (POL), Aleksandar Radonjic (AUT)

24 September 2025
18:00

Boxscore

**TARR KSC Szekszárd** (Hungary)	**84**–55	(Czech Republic) DSK Basketball Brandys
Scoring by quarter: **24**–14, 17–**21**, **27**–10, **16**–10
Pts: Dombai 30; Rebs: Gakdeng 11; Asts: Rodrigues 6		Pts: Liskova 14; Rebs: Pavic 7 Asts: Zilova 4

Varosi Sportcsarnok, Szekszárd
Attendance: 600
Referees: Zdenko Tomasovic (SVK), Amalia Marchis (ROU), Josip Mikulić (CRO)

TARR KSC Szekszárd won 165–124 on aggregate

== See also ==
- 2025–26 EuroLeague Women
- 2025–26 EuroLeague Women regular season
- 2025–26 EuroCup Women
- 2025–26 EuroCup Women regular season
- 2025–26 EuroCup Women knockout stage
- 2025 FIBA Europe SuperCup Women
- 2025–26 EuroLeague Women qualification round

Reference
First leg
Second leg
