= Elizabeth Eliot =

Elizabeth Eliot (or similar) may refer to:

== People ==
- Elizabeth Eliot (1616–?), daughter of Sir John Eliot and first wife of Nathaniel Fiennes
- Elizabeth Elliot (baptized 1645), daughter of Daniel Gookin and second wife of Edmund Quincy
- Elizabeth Eliot (died 1771), daughter of Richard Eliot and first wife of Charles Cocks, 1st Baron Somers
- Elizabeth Mary Eliot (1785–1872), daughter of Francis Perceval Eliot
- Lady Elizabeth Harriet Cornwallis Eliot (1833–1835), daughter of Edward Eliot, 3rd Earl of St Germans
- Hon Elizabeth Eliot of Port Eliot, Cornwall, subject of an 1838 statue Samuel Joseph
- Elisabeth Elliot (1926–2015), Christian author and speaker
- Elizabeth Anne Elliott (1918–2001), American petroleum geologist
- Elizabeth Elliott (romance author), American novelist
- Elizabeth Elliott (paediatrician), Australian clinician scientist

== Fiction ==
- Elizabeth Elliot, a character in Jane Austen's 1816 work Persuasion

== See also ==
- Beth Elliott (born 1950), American folk singer, activist, and writer
