= Anna Makurat =

Polish basketball player

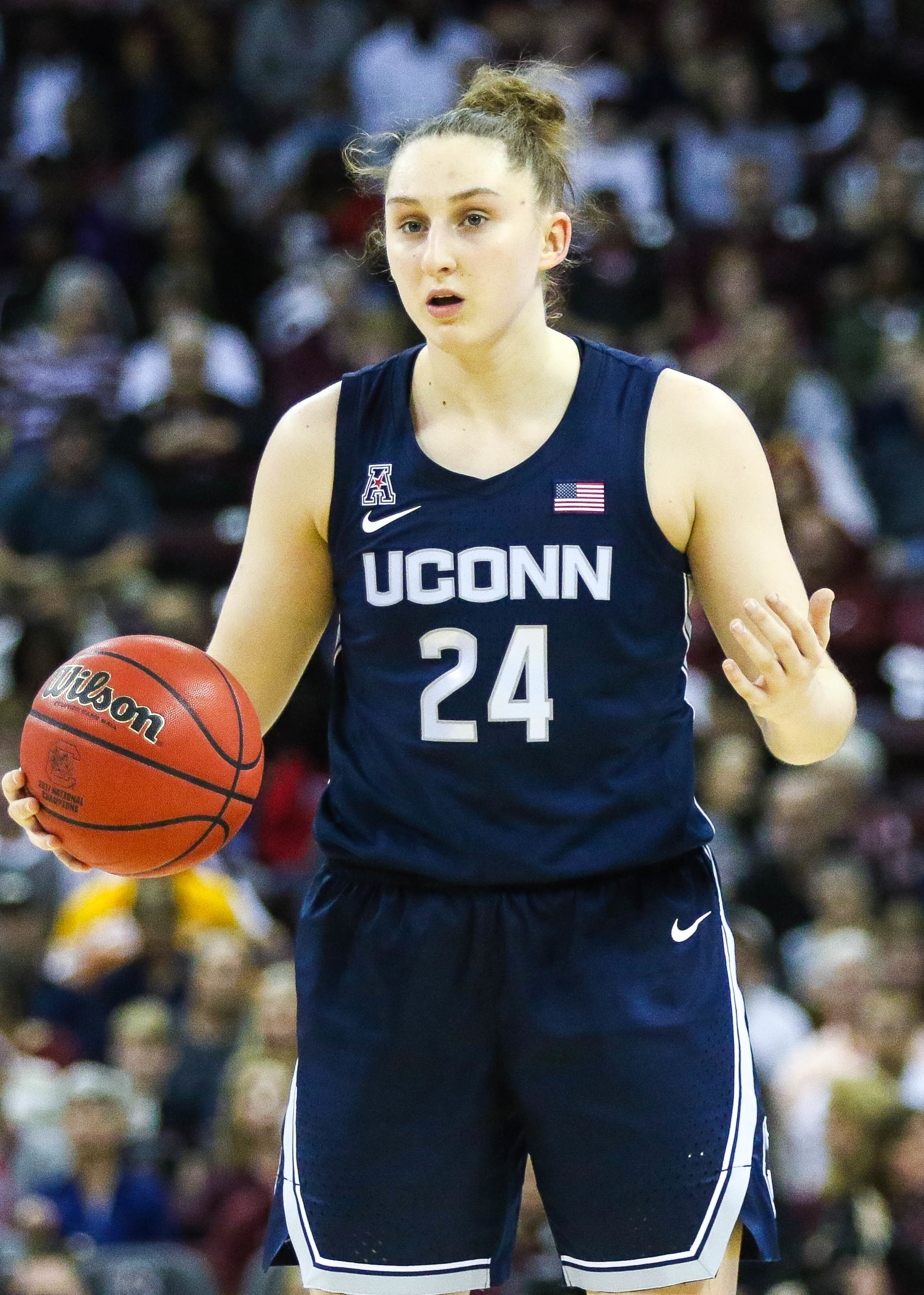
- Makurat with UConn in 2020

No. 11 – Vilnius Kibirkštis
- Position: Shooting guard
- League: Lithuanian Womens Basketball League

Personal information
- Born: 31 March 2000 (age 26) Lębork, Poland
- Listed height: 1.88 m (6 ft 2 in)

Career information
- College: UConn (2019–2021)
- Playing career: 2017–present

Career history
- 2017–2019: Arka Gdynia
- 2021–2022: AZS AJP Gorzów Wielkopolski
- 2022-2023: Dinamo Banco di Sardegna Sassari
- 2023-2026: Umana Reyer Venezia
- 2026-present: Vilniaus Kibirkštis

Career highlights
- AAC All-Freshman Team (2020)
- Stats at Basketball Reference

Anna Makurat (born 31 March 2000) is a Polish professional basketball player for Umana Reyer Venezia of the Lega Basket Femminile (LBF) Serie A. She played college basketball for the UConn Huskies.

== College career ==
In 48 games for the UConn Huskies, she averaged 6.5 points, 3.7 rebounds and three assists per game.

In April 2021, she left the team, entering the NCAA transfer portal. Within a week, she announced on her Instagram page that she would return to Europe to pursue a professional career.

== National team career ==
Makurat has been a member of the Polish women's national basketball team.

== Personal life ==
Anna's older sister Ola Makurat has played basketball in NCAA Division I for three schools. Ola first played at Liberty from 2016 to 2018, and then transferred to Utah, playing there from 2019 to 2021 after sitting out a season due to NCAA transfer rules. With all NCAA basketball players in 2020–21 being granted an extra season of eligibility due to COVID-19, Ola remained eligible to play college basketball in the 2021–22 season; she chose to exercise her extra season, entering the transfer portal shortly before Anna and eventually choosing to play her final college season at Arkansas State.

Anna's younger sister Aga Makurat played for the Polish national U16 and U18 teams, and is playing in her freshman year at Vanderbilt University under Anna's former coach Shea Ralph.
