= Alexandra Wilke =

German basketball player

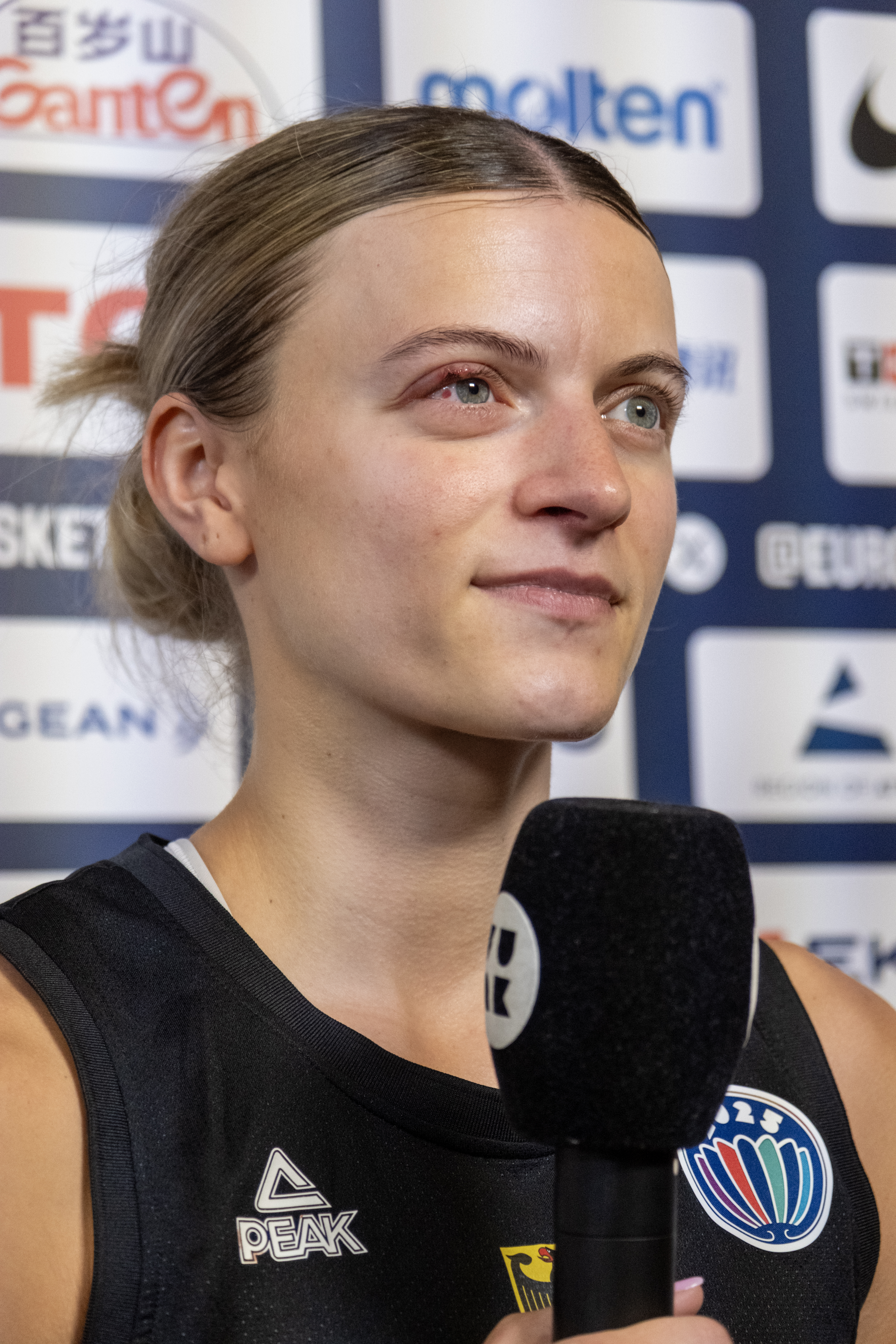

Personal information
- Born: 29 September 1996 (age 30)
- Listed height: 1.75 m (5 ft 9 in)

Alexandra Wilke (born 29 September 1996) is a German basketball player. She represented Germany at the 2024 Summer Olympics.
