= Carmen Miloglav =

Croatian basketball player

Ragusa Dubrovnik
- Position: Shooting guard

Personal information
- Born: February 25, 1991 (age 35) Dubrovnik, Croatia
- Listed height: 1.72 m (5 ft 8 in)

Career information
- WNBA draft: 2013: undrafted

Career history
- Lokomotiva Karlovy Vary
- 2013–2015: Ragusa Dubrovnik
- 2015–2016: CB Islas Canarias
- 2016: Zadar
- 2016–present: CB Avenida

Carmen Miloglav (born 25 February 1991 in Dubrovnik, Croatia) is a Croatian female basketball player.
