= Sara Chevaugeon =

French basketball player

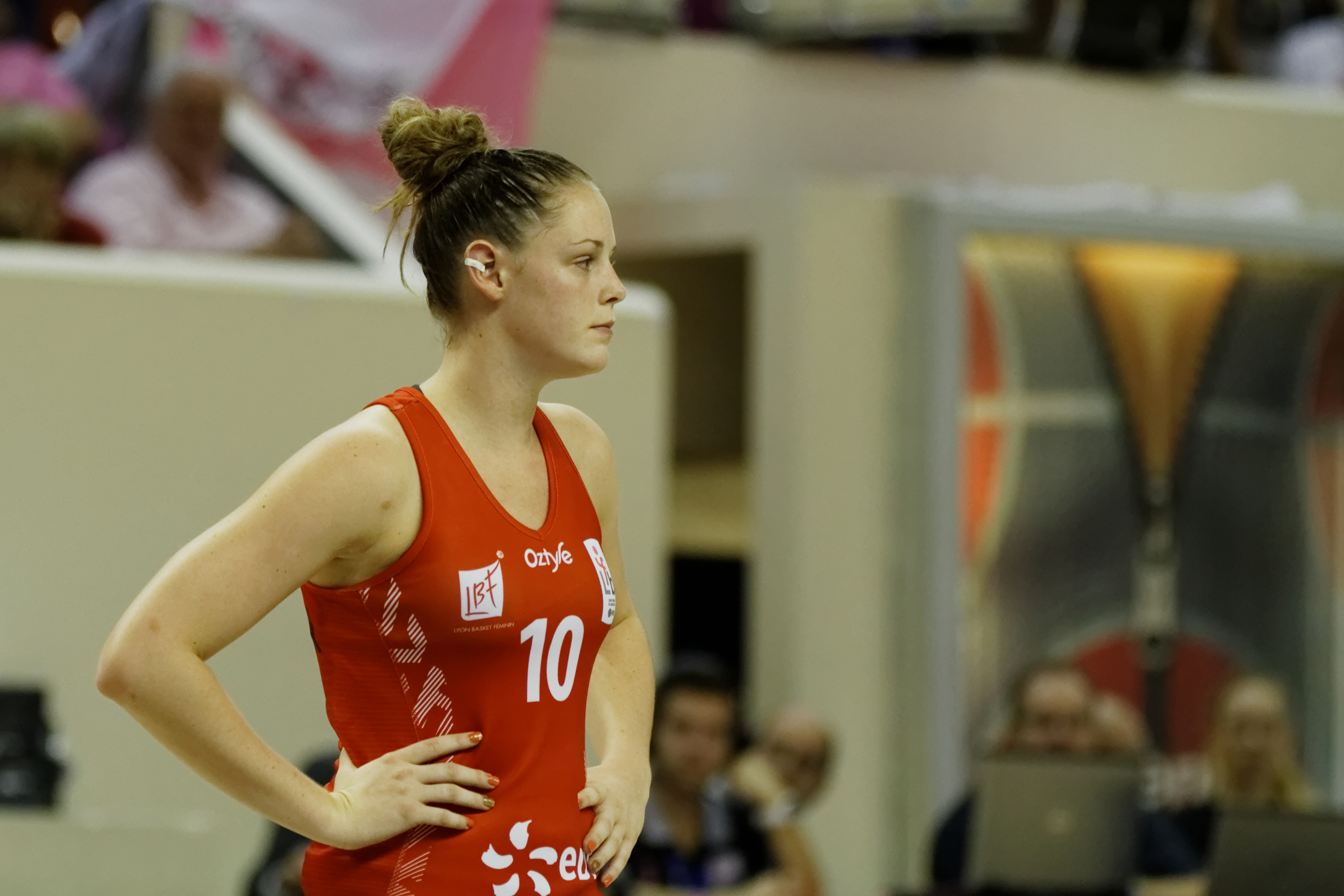

No. 88 – Flammes Carolo
- Position: Guard
- League: LFB

Personal information
- Born: 12 February 1993 (age 33) La Rochelle, France
- Listed height: 1.77 m (5 ft 10 in)

Career information
- WNBA draft: 2015: undrafted

Sara Chevaugeon (born 12 February 1993) is a French basketball player for Flammes Carolo and the French national team.

She represented France at the FIBA Women's EuroBasket 2019.
