= Nina Novak =

Venezuelan ballet dancer (1923–2022)

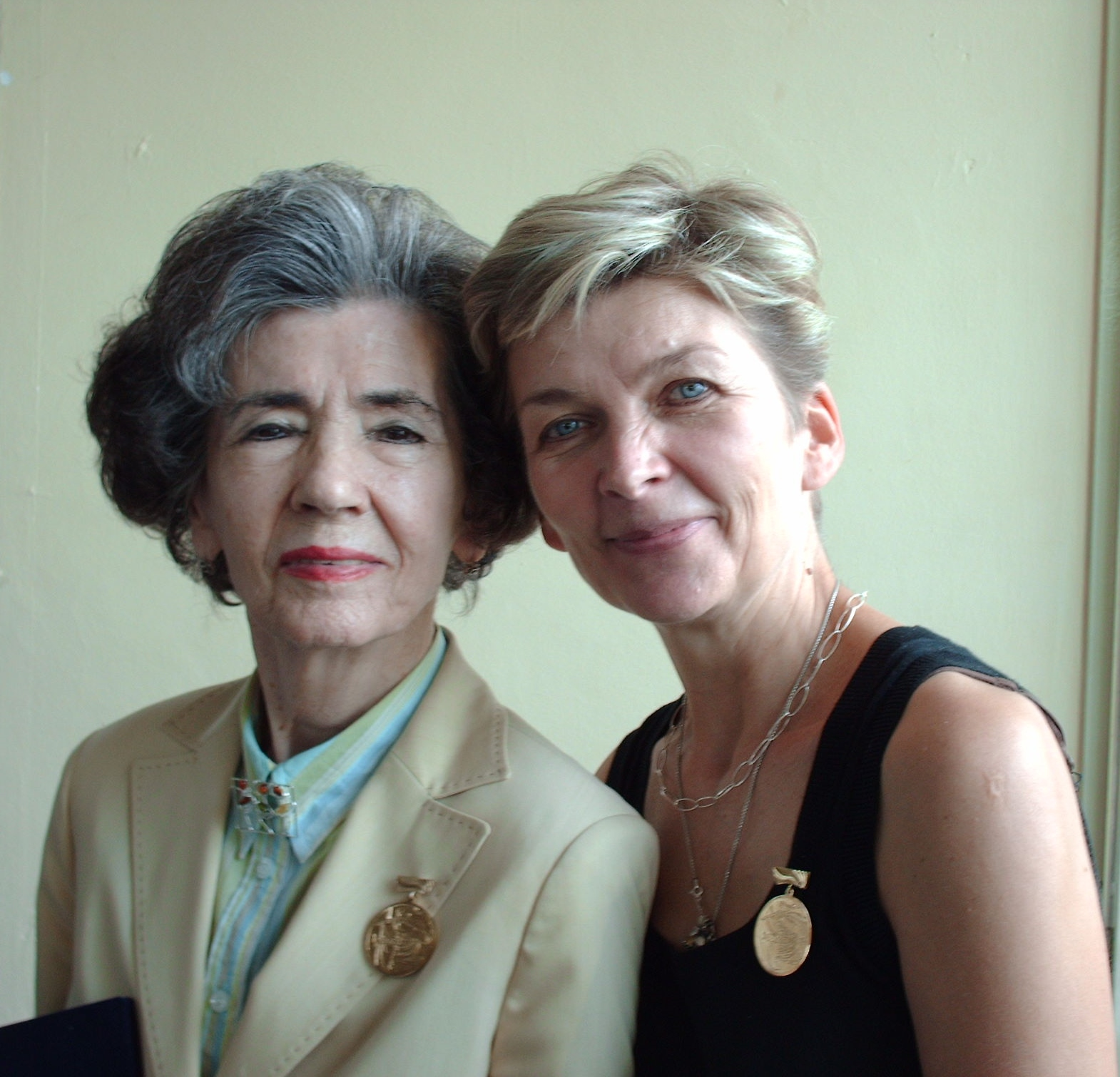
- Novak (on left) in May 1998
- Born: Janina Nowak; 23 March 1923; Warsaw, Poland
- Died: 15 March 2022 (aged 98); East Norriton Township, Pennsylvania, U.S.
- Occupations: ballet dancer and choreographer

Nina Novak (23 March 1923 – 15 March 2022) was a Polish prima ballerina, choreographer, ballet director, and dance teacher.

== Biography ==
Novak was born in Warsaw, Poland on 23 March 1923, as Janina Nowak. She began her study of Ballet at the age of eight at the Warsaw Opera Ballet School.

From 1937 to 1939, she was a soloist of the Polish Representative Ballet, and after the war in the ballet groups of Feliks Parnell and Mikołaj Kopiński.

In the late 1940s, she left for the United States, where she became a prima ballerina, ballet master and teacher at Ballet Russe de Monte-Carlo. After finishing her career in 1960s, she left for Venezuela, where she opened her own ballet school, and since 1991 she has been the director of her own ballet school in Caracas, Ballet Clásico de Caracas.

In Poland, she made guest appearances in 1961 in Warsaw and Poznań in the ballets Giselle and Swan Lake, and in 1978 in the Coppélia ballet at the Grand Theater in Warsaw.

On 25 February 2020, the book Taniec na gruzach. Nina Novak w rozmowie z Wiktorem Krajewskim was published, consisting of an interview with Nina Novak by Wiktor Krajewski. She was an honorary citizen of five cities in the United States.

== Awards ==
In 2017, she was awarded the Knight's Cross of the Order of Polonia Restituta.

== Death ==
Novak died in East Norriton Township, Pennsylvania, eight days shy of her 99th birthday, on March 15, 2022.
