= Szabó Kati Sports Hall =

Indoor arena in Sfântu Gheorghe, Romania

Sala Sporturilor Szabó Kati
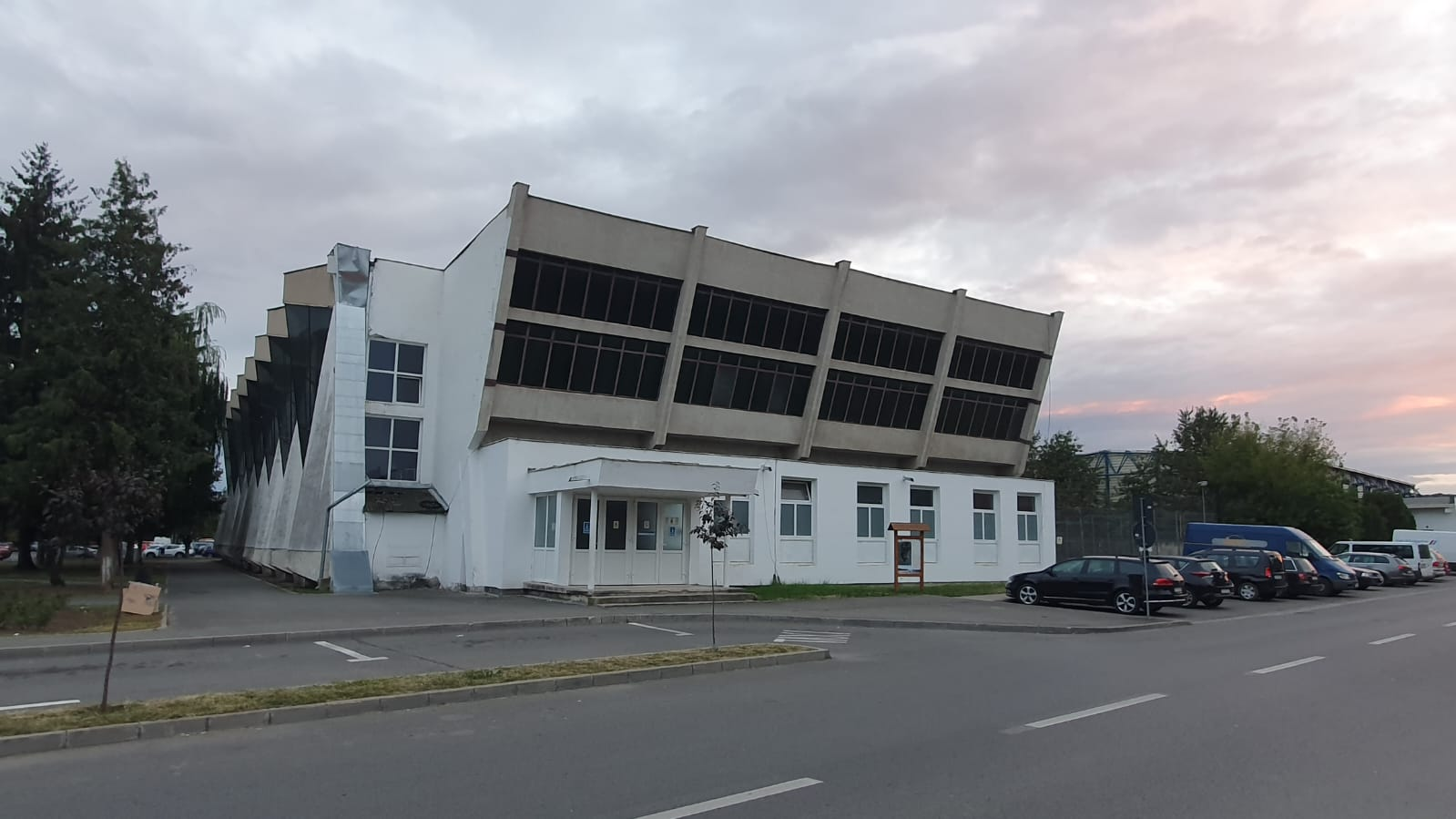
- View of venue (2024)
- Interactive map of Sala Sporturilor Szabó Kati
- Full name: Sala Sporturilor Szabó Kati
- Former names: Sala Sporturilor
- Location: Sfântu Gheorghe, Romania
- Coordinates: 45°51′30.3″N 25°46′39.2″E
- Owner: Municipality of Sfântu Gheorghe
- Operator: Sepsi SIC
- Capacity: 1,050 (basketball / handball)
- Surface: Maple wood

Construction
- Opened: 1970s
- Renovated: 2011–2013

Tenant
- Sepsi SIC

Szabó Kati Sports Hall is an indoor arena located in Sfântu Gheorghe, Romania. The arena is named after the Romanian artistic gymnast Ecaterina Szabo. It is the home arena of the women's professional basketball club Sepsi SIC and has a capacity of 1,050 seats. In addition to the playing field and grandstand, the sports hall is equipped with a strength and recovery room with a dry sauna, a steam room and a Jacuzzi pool, 4 changing rooms, a medical and anti-doping room and referees' changing rooms.
