= Petra Záplatová =

Czech basketball player

No. 8 – Žabiny Brno
- Position: Point guard
- League: ŽBL

Personal information
- Born: 29 December 1991 (age 34) Trutnov, Czechoslovakia
- Listed height: 5 ft 9 in (1.75 m)

Petra Záplatová (born 29 December 1991) is a Czech basketball player for BK Brno and the Czech national team.

She participated at the EuroBasket Women 2017.
