= Ameryst Alston =

American basketball player (born 1995)

Elazığ İl Özel İdarespor
- Position: Point guard
- League: TKBL

Personal information
- Born: June 20, 1995 (age 31)
- Listed height: 5 ft 9 in (1.75 m)

Career information
- High school: Canton McKinley (Canton, Ohio)
- College: Ohio State (2012–2016)
- WNBA draft: 2016: 2nd round, 24th overall pick
- Drafted by: New York Liberty
- Playing career: 2016–present

Career history
- 2016–2017: New York Liberty
- 2016–2017: Al Qazares
- 2017–2018: Gernika KESB
- 2018–2019: CD Zamarat
- 2019–2020: Kouvottaret
- 2020–2021: BC Winterthur
- 2021–2022: Valur
- 2022–present: Elazığ İl Özel İdarespor

Career highlights
- Úrvalsdeild kvenna assist leader (2022); 3x First-team All-Big Ten (2014–2016); Big Ten All-Freshman Team (2013)
- Stats at WNBA.com
- Stats at Basketball Reference

Ameryst Alston (born 20 June 1995) is an American professional basketball player. She played college basketball for Ohio State University before being selected by the New York Liberty in the 2016 WNBA draft where she played from 2016 to 2017.

== Early life ==
Alston played for Canton McKinley High School in Canton, Ohio.

== College career ==
After graduating from Canton McKinley, Alston played college basketball for Ohio State University from 2012 to 2016. She was a three-time All-Big Ten First Team selection and scored 2,165 points over her four year career.

== Professional career ==
Alston was selected by the New York Liberty with the 24th pick in the 2016 WNBA draft and appeared in one game during the 2016 season before being waived when veteran Swin Cash re-signed with New York. She later signed with Spanish club Al-Qazeres Extremadura where she averaged 16.1 points, 3.1 rebounds and 2.6 assists per game during the 2016–2017 season.

In April 2018, Alston signed a training camp contract with the Chicago Sky. She was waived by the Sky a month later before the start of the season.

After playing in the SB League for BC Winterthur during the 2020–2021 season, Alston signed with reigning Icelandic champions Valur in August 2021. In 27 games, she averaged 26.0 points, 9.1 rebounds and league leading 6.6 assists per game.

In September 2022, Alston signed with Elazığ İl Özel İdarespor of the Turkish second-tier TKBL.

== Career statistics ==
Legend
GP	Games played	GS	Games started	MPG	Minutes per game	RPG	Rebounds per game
APG	Assists per game	SPG	Steals per game	BPG	Blocks per game	PPG	Points per game
TO	Turnovers per game	FG%	Field-goal percentage	3P%	3-point field-goal percentage	FT%	Free-throw percentage
**Bold**	Career best	°	League leader

=== WNBA ===
==== Regular season ====
Year	Team	GP	GS	MPG	FG%	3P%	FT%	RPG	APG	SPG	BPG	TO	PPG
2016	New York	1	0	0.0	0.0	0.0	0.0	0.0	0.0	0.0	0.0	0.0	0.0
2017	New York	**2**	0	**1.5**	**50.0**	0.0	0.0	**1.0**	**0.5**	0.0	0.0	**0.5**	**1.0**
Career	2 years, 1 team	3	0	1.0	50.0	0.0	0.0	0.7	0.3	0.0	0.0	0.3	0.7

=== College ===
Year	Team	GP	GS	MPG	FG%	3P%	FT%	RPG	APG	SPG	BPG	TO	PPG
2012–13	Ohio State	31	25	30.3	**49.0**	31.6	71.7	3.9	2.8	1.1	0.1	**2.4**	6.5
2013–14	Ohio State	**35**	33	36.7	46.5	**37.7**	**83.1**	3.4	3.2	1.1	0.1	3.6	19.0
2014–15	Ohio State	35	**35**	**37.7**	45.0	35.6	83.2	**4.8**	**4.0**	**1.3**	0.1	2.8	**19.8**
2015–16	Ohio State	33	32	35.2	44.9	36.3	80.2	3.4	3.5	**1.3**	0.1	**2.4**	18.3
**Career**		134	125	35.1	45.7	36.1	81.3	3.9	3.4	1.2	0.1	2.8	16.2
Statistics retrieved from Sports-Reference.
