= 2025–26 EuroCup Women =

European women's basketball tournament

EuroCup Women
- Season: 2025–26
- Dates: Qualifying: 18–25 September 2025; Regular season: 9 October – 27 November 2025; Knockout stage: 11 December 2025 – 9 April 2026
- Teams: Regular season: 48; Knockout stage: 32; Total: 53 (from 21 countries)

Finals
- Champions: (Turkey) ÇİMSA ÇBK Mersin (1st title)
- Runners-up: (Greece) Athinaikos Qualco
- Finals MVP: (Turkey) Kennedy Burke

Statistical leaders
Points	(United States) Sydney Taylor	23.0
Rebounds	(Cameroon) Dulcy Fankam	11.0
Assists	(Croatia) Matea Tadić	9.0
Steals	(Italy) Emma Giacchetti	3.3
Blocks	(United States) Sedona Prince	2.5
Efficiency	(United States) Sedona Prince	26.6

The 2025–26 EuroCup Women was the 55th edition of FIBA Europe's second-tier international competition for European women's basketball clubs, and the 24th season since it was renamed from the Ronchetti Cup to the EuroCup Women. The season began on 18 September 2025 ended on 9 April 2026 with the Final.

The winners of the EuroCup Women qualify for the 2025 SuperCup and automatically qualify for next season's edition of this tournament, unless they participate in the EuroLeague Women instead.

ESB Villeneuve-d'Ascq were the defending champions, but they lost in the semifinals. ÇİMSA ÇBK Mersin won their first EuroCup title by defeating Athinaikos Qualco 160–157 in the finals.

== Format ==
- Regular season

After the qualifiers, 48 teams are divided into 12 groups of 4. The groups are held in a double home and away format. The top 2 plus the 4 best third place teams advancing to the knockout stage.

- Knockout stage

In the knockout stage, the 28 teams, plus the 4 who dropped down from the Euroleague Women, are seeded based on their results in the regular season. Each tie in the knockout stage is played in a home and away format, where the winner on aggregate wins the tie and advances to the next round.

== Rankings ==
The results are based on the results of the past three seasons.

- Associations 1–5 can register five teams.
- Associations 6–10 can register four teams.
- Associations below the top 10 can register three teams.

Apart from the distribution based on the rankings, countries could have additional teams participating in the EuroCup Women, as noted below:

- (EL) – Additional teams dropping down from the EuroLeague Women

Rank	Association	Average points	Teams	Notes
1	Turkey	262.00	2	+1 (EL)
2	France	184.67	4	
3	Spain	176.33	5	
4	Italy	115.33	3	
5	Czech Republic	110.67	4	+1 (EL)
6	Hungary	81.33	2	+1 (EL)
7	Poland	51.33	3	+2 (EL)
8	Belgium	26.00	3	
9	Greece	21.33	4	+1 (EL)
10	Israel	20.00	1	
10	(United Kingdom) Great Britain	20.00	0	
12	Romania	18.00	2	+1 (EL)
13	Lithuania	11.33	1	+1 (EL)

Rank	Association	Average points	Teams	Notes
14	Portugal	10.67	2	
15	Slovakia	10.00	1	
15	Germany	10.00	2	
17	Latvia	8.00	1	
18	Switzerland	7.33	3	
19	Serbia	6.00	1	+1 (EL)
20	Luxembourg	5.33	0	
21	Croatia	3.33	2	
22	Finland	1.33	0	
22	Armenia	1.33	0	
22	Cyprus	1.33	0	
22	Bulgaria	1.33	1	
N/A	Kosovo	0.00	1	

== Teams ==
The labels in the parentheses show how each team qualified for the place of its starting round:

- TH EL: EuroLeague Women title holders
- TH EC: EuroCup Women title holders
- 1st, 2nd, 3rd etc.: League position of the previous season
- RS: Regular season winners
- CW: Cup winners
- CR: Cup runners-up

The teams with the S in the qualification round means they were seeded. Teams with EL took part in the EuroLeague Women Qualification round or the regular season.

The teams were announced on 8 July 2025, with a total of 49 clubs registering for the competition. Starting this season, the winners of the previous season can take part, regardless of their performance in their domestic league.

On 15 July 2025, ASVEL Féminin withdrew due to financial reasons. As a result, Baxi Ferrol were given a direct place in the group stage and SBŠ Ostrava were awarded seeded status in the qualification round.

Play Off Round 1
(Poland) VBW Gdynia ^{EL}	(Hungary) Sopron Basket ^{EL}	(Greece) Olympiacos SFP ^{EL}	(Turkey) ÇİMSA ÇBK Mersin ^{EL}
Regular season
(Czech Republic) Žabiny Brno ^{EL}	(Serbia) KKZ Crvena zvezda ^{EL}	(Romania) ACS Sepsi SIC ^{EL}	(Poland) AZS UMCS Lublin ^{EL}
(Lithuania) Kibirkštis-TOKS ^{EL}	(Turkey) Beşiktaş Boa (4th)	(Turkey) Emlak Konut SK (5th)	(France) Charnay Basket (3rd)
(France) BLMA (6th)	(France) UFAB 49 (7th)	(France) Villeneuve-d'Ascq LM ^{TH EC} (9th)	(Spain) Perfumerías Avenida (4th)
(Spain) Hozono Global Jairis (5th, CW)	(Spain) Movistar Estudiantes (6th)	(Spain) Baxi Ferrol (Note: Originally placed in the qualification round, Baxi Ferrol were placed in the regular season after ASVEL Féminin's withdrawal.) (8th)	(Italy) Magnolia Basket Campobasso (3rd)
(Italy) GEAS Basket (6th)	(Czech Republic) KP Brno (3rd)	(Czech Republic) Levhartice Chomutov (4th)	(Hungary) NKA Universitas PEAC (3rd)
(Poland) KSSSE Enea AZS AJP Gorzów (2nd, CW)	(Poland) Ślęza Wrocław (3rd)	(Poland) MB Zagłębie Sosnowiec (4th)	(Belgium) Castors Braine (1st)
(Belgium) Kangoeroes Basket Mechelen (2nd)	(Belgium) Basket Namur Capitale (3rd)	(Greece) Athinaikos Qualco (2nd)	(Greece) Panathinaikos AC (3rd)
(Romania) CS Rapid București (4th)	(Israel) Elitzur Ramla (3rd)	(Lithuania) BC Neptūnas-Amberton (2nd)	(Portugal) SL Benfica (1st)
(Portugal) Sportiva/AzorisHotels (3rd)	(Germany) Rutronik Stars Keltern (1st)	(Germany) Saarlouis Royals (2nd)	(Slovakia) Piešťanské Čajky (1st)
(Latvia) TTT Riga (1st)	(Switzerland) Nyon Basket Feminin (1st)	(Switzerland) BCF Elfic Fribourg (2nd)	(Croatia) ŽKK Ragusa (1st)
(Croatia) WBC Trešnjevka Dinamo LTD (2nd)	(Bulgaria) Beroe Stara Zagora (2nd)	(Kosovo) KBF Peja 03 (2nd)	
Qualification round
(Spain) Lointek Gernika Bizkaia ^{S} (9th)	(Italy) BDS Dinamo Sassari ^{S} (10th)	(Czech Republic) SBŠ Ostrava (Note: After ASVEL Féminin's withdrawal, SBŠ Ostrava were upgraded to seeded status for the qualification round.) ^{S} (5th)	(Czech Republic) DSK Basketball Brandys (7th)
(Hungary) TARR KSC Szekszárd ^{S} (6th)	(Greece) Panathlitikos Sykeon (5th)	(Greece) PAS Giannina (7th)	(Romania) CS Universitatea Cluj ^{S} (6th)
(Switzerland) BBC Troistorrents-Chablais (5th)	(Serbia) UZKK Student (4th)		

=== Name changes ===
The following teams' names were changed during the season.

Original name	New name	Matchday
(Poland) InvestInTheWest Enea Gorzow	(Poland) KSSSE Enea AZS AJP Gorzów (Note: Their name was temporarily Enea Gorzów before changing to their current name.)	Matchday One
(Croatia) ŽKK Trešnjevka 2009	(Croatia) WBC Trešnjevka Dinamo LTD	Matchday One
(Poland) AZS UMCS Lublin	(Poland) LOTTO AZS UMCS Lublin	Matchday Three

== Schedule ==
Phase	Round	Dates
Qualification round	Matchday 1	18 September 2025
Qualification round	Matchday 2	25 September 2025
Regular season	Matchday 1	9 October 2025
Regular season	Matchday 2	16 October 2025
Regular season	Matchday 3	23 October 2025
Regular season	Matchday 4	30 October 2025
Regular season	Matchday 5	5 November 2025
Regular season	Matchday 6	27 November 2025
Play-off round 1	Matchday 1	11 December 2025
Play-off round 1	Matchday 2	19 December 2025
Round of 16	Matchday 1	15 January 2026
Round of 16	Matchday 2	22 January 2026
Quarterfinals	Matchday 1	5 February 2026
Quarterfinals	Matchday 2	12 February 2026
Semifinals	Matchday 1	26 February 2026
Semifinals	Matchday 2	4 March 2026
Finals	Matchday 1	2 April 2026
Finals	Matchday 2	9 April 2026

== Qualification round ==
The draw for the qualification round was conducted on 23 July 2025. The winners advance to the regular season while the losers are eliminated.

Team 1	Agg.	Team 2	1st leg	2nd leg
CS Universitatea Cluj (Romania)	151–174	(Serbia) UZKK Student	78–93	73–81
Lointek Gernika Bizkaia (Spain)	184–118	(Greece) Pas Giannina	90–57	94–61
BDS Dinamo Sassari (Italy)	138–118	(Greece) Panathlitikos Sykeon	72–56	66–62
SBŠ Ostrava (Czech Republic)	167–129	(Switzerland) BBC Troistorrents-Chablais	65–65	102–64
TARR KSC Szekszárd (Hungary)	165–124	(Czech Republic) DSK Basketball Brandys	81–69	84–59

== Regular season ==
Location of teams of the 2025–26 EuroCup Women regular season.
Brown: Group A; Green: Group B; Deep Pink: Group C; Yellow: Group D;
Red: Group E; Cyan: Group F; Blue: Group G; Purple: Group H;
Pink: Group I; Turquoise: Group J; Spring Green: Group K; Orange: Group L.

48 teams are divided into 12 groups of 4, where the top 2, plus the four best third placed teams, advance to play-off round 1.

This season, Saarlouis Royals, Nyon Basket Feminin, Trešnjevka 2009, Peja 03, SBŠ Ostrava and UZKK Student all make their debut in the regular season.

For the first time since 2009–10, Croatia have two teams in the regular season. Czech Republic have four teams for the first time.

CS Rapid București takes part for the first time since the tournament was renamed the EuroCup Women.

21 national associations will be represented this season, down by one compared to 2024–25. Kosovo, Bulgaria and Croatia are present after absences for six, three and two years respectively. Armenia, Cyprus, Finland and Great Britain didn't take part this season.

Tiebreakers

If teams are level on record at the end of the regular season, tiebreakers are applied in the following order:

1. Head-to-head record
2. Head-to-head point differential
3. Head-to-head points scored
4. Point differential for the entire regular season
5. Points scored for the entire regular season

Location of Benelux teams of the 2025–26 EuroCup Women group stage.
Brown: Group A; Green: Group B;
Yellow: Group D;
Location of teams in 2025–26 EuroCup Women regular season (Azores).
Deep Pink: Group C.

=== Group A ===
Pos	Team	Pld	W	L	PF	PA	PD	Pts	Qualification	MAG	ZAB	CAS	TRE
1	(Italy) Magnolia Basket Campobasso	6	4	2	451	346	+105	10 (Note: Magnolia Basket Campobasso 2–2, +27 PD; Žabiny Brno 2–2, +12 PD; Castors Braine 2–2, −39 PD)	Play-off Round 1	—	54–76	86–59	76–50
2	(Czech Republic) Žabiny Brno	6	4	2	456	387	+69	10	Play-off Round 1	71–67	—	65–71	83–58
3	(Belgium) Castors Braine	6	4	2	443	397	+46	10	Play-off Round 1	46–72	80–72	—	110–43
4	(Croatia) WBC Trešnjevka Dinamo LTD	6	0	6	311	531	−220	6		44–96	57–89	59–77	—

Source: EuroCup Women
Rules for classification: 1) Points; 2) Points difference; 3) Points scored.

=== Group B ===
Pos	Team	Pld	W	L	PF	PA	PD	Pts	Qualification	LUB	JAI	STU	NAM
1	(Poland) LOTTO AZS UMCS Lublin	6	5	1	456	379	+77	11	Play-off Round 1	—	75–61	86–62	86–62
2	(Spain) Hozono Global Jairis	6	4	2	441	364	+77	10	Play-off Round 1	64–58	—	99–62	53–62
3	(Serbia) UŽKK Student	6	2	4	410	501	−91	8		73–86	62–84	—	71–69
4	(Belgium) Basket Namur Capitale	6	1	5	372	435	−63	7		57–65	45–80	77–80	—

Source: EuroCup Women
Rules for classification: 1) Points; 2) Points difference; 3) Points scored.

=== Group C ===
Pos	Team	Pld	W	L	PF	PA	PD	Pts	Qualification	NKA	GER	RAM	SPO
1	(Hungary) NKA Universitas PEAC	6	6	0	481	335	+146	12	Play-off Round 1	—	62–60	77–61	97–59
2	(Spain) Lointek Gernika Bizkaia	6	3	3	430	366	+64	9 (Note: Lointek Gernika Bizkaia 143–129 Elitzur Ramla)	Play-off Round 1	63–66	—	62–64	82–61
3	(Israel) Elitzur Ramla	6	3	3	413	405	+8	9	Play-off Round 1	50–78	65–81	—	86–56
4	(Portugal) Sportiva/AzorisHotels	6	0	6	317	535	−218	6		42–101	48–82	51–87	—

Source: EuroCup Women
Rules for classification: 1) Points; 2) Points difference; 3) Points scored.

=== Group D ===
Pos	Team	Pld	W	L	PF	PA	PD	Pts	Qualification	KAN	GEA	SZE	SEP
1	(Belgium) Kangoeroes Basket Mechelen	6	5	1	481	401	+80	11	Play-off Round 1	—	86–69	81–70	91–55
2	(Italy) GEAS Basket	6	3	3	427	389	+38	9 (Note: GEAS Basket 149–144 TARR KSC Szekszárd)	Play-off Round 1	54–72	—	76–66	77–44
3	(Hungary) TARR KSC Szekszárd	6	3	3	433	434	−1	9		74–69	78–73	—	82–86
4	(Romania) ACS Sepsi SIC	6	1	5	356	473	−117	7		79–83	43–78	49–63	—

Source: EuroCup Women
Rules for classification: 1) Points; 2) Points difference; 3) Points scored.

=== Group E ===
Pos	Team	Pld	W	L	PF	PA	PD	Pts	Qualification	CRV	EML	TTT	SAA
1	(Serbia) KKZ Crvena zvezda	6	6	0	489	398	+91	12	Play-off Round 1	—	89–77	84–66	78–65
2	(Turkey) Emlak Konut SK	6	4	2	470	423	+47	10	Play-off Round 1	69–77	—	84–56	89–69
3	(Latvia) TTT Riga	6	2	4	402	453	−51	8		66–82	59–70	—	75–61
4	(Germany) Saarlouis Royals	6	0	6	395	482	−87	6		55–79	73–81	72–80	—

Source: EuroCup Women
Rules for classification: 1) Points; 2) Points difference; 3) Points scored.

=== Group F ===
Pos	Team	Pld	W	L	PF	PA	PD	Pts	Qualification	RUT	KIR	PEJ	LEV
1	(Germany) Rutronik Stars Keltern	6	6	0	495	358	+137	12	Play-off Round 1	—	76–63	92–57	91–49
2	(Lithuania) Kibirkštis-TOKS	6	4	2	532	442	+90	10	Play-off Round 1	69–87	—	85–69	108–73
3	(Kosovo) KBF Peja 03	6	1	5	396	517	−121	7 (Note: KBF Peja 03 148–146 Levhartice Chomutov)		60–83	62–111	—	75–81
4	(Czech Republic) Levhartice Chomutov	6	1	5	403	509	−106	7		60–66	75–96	65–73	—

Source: EuroCup Women
Rules for classification: 1) Points; 2) Points difference; 3) Points scored.

=== Group G ===
Pos	Team	Pld	W	L	PF	PA	PD	Pts	Qualification	AVE	PAN	NEP	NYO
1	(Spain) Perfumerias Avenida	6	5	1	492	385	+107	11	Play-off Round 1	—	70–78	79–48	81–53
2	(Greece) Panathinaikos AC	6	4	2	516	511	+5	10	Play-off Round 1	73–92	—	94–87	100–113
3	(Lithuania) BC Neptūnas-Amberton	6	2	4	432	487	−55	8		61–88	69–82	—	86–79
4	(Switzerland) Nyon Basket Feminin	6	1	5	462	519	−57	7		72–82	80–89	65–81	—

Source: EuroCup Women
Rules for classification: 1) Points; 2) Points difference; 3) Points scored.

=== Group H ===
Pos	Team	Pld	W	L	PF	PA	PD	Pts	Qualification	BLMA	BRN	DIN	RAG
1	(France) BLMA	6	6	0	555	371	+184	12	Play-off Round 1	—	77–70	101–72	105–48
2	(Czech Republic) KP Brno	6	4	2	385	326	+59	10	Play-off Round 1	60–88	—	76–73	74–42
3	(Italy) BDS Dinamo Sassari	6	2	4	353	385	−32	7		67–84	0–20 (Note: The match was abandoned after a power outage at the venue, with BDS Dinamo Sassari leading 69–67. FIBA awarded KP Brno a 20–0 forfeit win.)	—	80–53
4	(Croatia) ŽKK Ragusa	6	0	6	294	505	−211	6		54–100	46–85	51–61	—

Source: EuroCup Women
Rules for classification: 1) Points; 2) Points difference; 3) Points scored.

=== Group I ===
Pos	Team	Pld	W	L	PF	PA	PD	Pts	Qualification	EST	UFAB	RAP	PIE
1	(Spain) Movistar Estudiantes	6	5	1	456	410	+46	11	Play-off Round 1	—	76–86	65–61	76–55
2	(France) UFAB 49	6	4	2	470	431	+39	10	Play-off Round 1	82–87	—	79–86	64–61
3	(Romania) CS Rapid București	6	3	3	425	422	+3	9	Play-off Round 1	74–88	64–78	—	69–51
4	(Slovakia) Piešťanské Čajky	6	0	6	337	425	−88	6		52–64	57–81	61–71	—

Source: EuroCup Women
Rules for classification: 1) Points; 2) Points difference; 3) Points scored.

=== Group J ===
Pos	Team	Pld	W	L	PF	PA	PD	Pts	Qualification	ATH	CHA	BES	GOR
1	(Greece) Athinaikos Qualco	6	5	1	474	422	+52	11	Play-off Round 1	—	75–59	84–82	79–56
2	(France) Charnay Basket	6	3	3	453	454	−1	9 (Note: Charnay Basket 154–148 Beşiktaş Boa)	Play-off Round 1	69–75	—	67–59	84–70
3	(Turkey) Beşiktaş Boa	6	3	3	499	479	+20	9	Play-off Round 1	87–84	89–87	—	100–70
4	(Poland) KSSSE Enea AZS AJP Gorzów	6	1	5	438	509	−71	7		69–77	86–87	87–82	—

Source: EuroCup Women
Rules for classification: 1) Points; 2) Points difference; 3) Points scored.

=== Group K ===
Pos	Team	Pld	W	L	PF	PA	PD	Pts	Qualification	FER	ZAG	OST	BEN
1	(Spain) Baxi Ferrol	6	6	0	553	373	+180	12	Play-off Round 1	—	92–49	100–64	109–58
2	(Poland) MB Zagłębie Sosnowiec	6	4	2	433	448	−15	10	Play-off Round 1	83–90	—	86–69	73–63
3	(Czech Republic) SBŠ Ostrava	6	2	4	436	493	−57	8		64–98	69–76	—	85–52
4	(Portugal) SL Benfica	6	0	6	374	482	−108	6		55–64	65–66	81–85	—

Source: EuroCup Women
Rules for classification: 1) Points; 2) Points difference; 3) Points scored.

=== Group L ===
Pos	Team	Pld	W	L	PF	PA	PD	Pts	Qualification	VIL	SLE	FRI	BER
1	(France) Villeneuve-d'Ascq LM	6	5	1	498	353	+145	11	Play-off Round 1	—	73–50	75–48	111–49
2	(Poland) Ślęza Wrocław	6	4	2	505	419	+86	10	Play-off Round 1	70–78	—	90–65	100–63
3	(Switzerland) BCF Elfic Fribourg	6	3	3	424	465	−41	9		75–68	74–96	—	78–74
4	(Bulgaria) Beroe Stara Zagora	6	0	6	375	565	−190	6		61–93	66–99	62–84	—

Source: EuroCup Women
Rules for classification: 1) Points; 2) Points difference; 3) Points scored.

=== Ranking of third place teams ===
Pos	Grp	Team	Pld	W	L	PF	PA	PD	Pts	Qualification
1	A	(Basketball Belgium) Castors Braine	6	4	2	443	397	+46	10	Play-off Round 1
2	J	(Turkish Basketball Federation) Beşiktaş Boa	6	3	3	499	479	+20	9	Play-off Round 1
3	C	(Israeli Basketball Association) Elitzur Ramla	6	3	3	413	405	+8	9	Play-off Round 1
4	I	(Romanian Basketball Federation) CS Rapid București	6	3	3	425	422	+3	9	Play-off Round 1
5	D	(Hungarian Basketball Federation) TARR KSC Szekszárd	6	3	3	433	434	−1	9	
6	L	(Swiss Basketball) BCF Elfic Fribourg	6	3	3	424	465	−41	9	
7	E	(Latvian Basketball Association) TTT Riga	6	2	4	402	453	−51	8	
8	G	(Lithuanian Basketball Federation) BC Neptūnas-Amberton	6	2	4	432	487	−55	8	
9	K	(Czech Basketball Federation) SBŠ Ostrava	6	2	4	436	493	−57	8	
10	B	(Basketball Federation of Serbia) UŽKK Student	6	2	4	410	501	−91	8	
11	H	(Italian Basketball Federation) BDS Dinamo Sassari	6	2	4	353	385	−32	7	
12	F	(Basketball Federation of Kosovo) KBF Peja 03	6	1	5	396	517	−121	7	

Source: FIBA
Rules for classification: 1) Points; 2) Points difference; 3) Points scored.

== Knockout stage ==
=== Seeding ===
The seeding was based on the results of the previous round. The four eliminated teams from the EuroLeague Women were pre-seeded into positions 1–4.

Seed	Grp	Team	Pld	W	L	PF	PA	PD	Pts	Qualification
1	D	(Turkish Basketball Federation) ÇİMSA ÇBK Mersin	6	1	5	399	444	−45	7	EuroLeague Women
2	C	(Hellenic Basketball Federation) Olympiacos SFP	6	1	5	383	533	−150	7	EuroLeague Women
3	B	(Hungarian Basketball Federation) Sopron Basket	6	0	6	368	507	−139	6	EuroLeague Women
4	A	(Polish Basketball Federation) VBW Gdynia	6	0	6	355	530	−175	6	EuroLeague Women
5	H	(French Federation of Basketball) BLMA	6	6	0	555	371	+184	12	First place
6	K	(Spanish Basketball Federation) Baxi Ferrol	6	6	0	553	373	+180	12	First place
7	C	(Hungarian Basketball Federation) NKA Universitas PEAC	6	6	0	481	335	+146	12	First place
8	F	(German Basketball Federation) Rutronik Stars Keltern	6	6	0	495	358	+137	12	First place
9	E	(Basketball Federation of Serbia) KKZ Crvena zvezda	6	6	0	489	398	+91	12	First place
10	L	(French Federation of Basketball) Villeneuve-d'Ascq LM	6	5	1	498	353	+145	11	First place
11	G	(Spanish Basketball Federation) Perfumerias Avenida	6	5	1	492	385	+107	11	First place
12	D	(Basketball Belgium) Kangoeroes Basket Mechelen	6	5	1	481	401	+80	11	First place
13	B	(Polish Basketball Federation) LOTTO AZS UMCS Lublin	6	5	1	456	379	+77	11	First place
14	J	(Hellenic Basketball Federation) Athinaikos Qualco	6	5	1	474	422	+52	11	First place
15	I	(Spanish Basketball Federation) Movistar Estudiantes	6	5	1	456	410	+46	11	First place
16	A	(Italian Basketball Federation) Magnolia Basket Campobasso	6	4	2	451	346	+105	10	First place
17	F	(Lithuanian Basketball Federation) Kibirkštis-TOKS	6	4	2	532	442	+90	10	Second place
18	L	(Polish Basketball Federation) Ślęza Wrocław	6	4	2	505	419	+86	10	Second place
19	B	(Spanish Basketball Federation) Hozono Global Jairis	6	4	2	441	364	+77	10	Second place
20	A	(Czech Basketball Federation) Žabiny Brno	6	4	2	456	387	+69	10	Second place
21	H	(Czech Basketball Federation) KP Brno	6	4	2	385	326	+59	10	Second place
22	E	(Turkish Basketball Federation) Emlak Konut SK	6	4	2	470	423	+47	10	Second place
23	I	(French Federation of Basketball) UFAB 49	6	4	2	470	431	+39	10	Second place
24	G	(Hellenic Basketball Federation) Panathinaikos AC	6	4	2	516	511	+5	10	Second place
25	K	(Polish Basketball Federation) MB Zagłębie Sosnowiec	6	4	2	433	448	−15	10	Second place
26	C	(Spanish Basketball Federation) Lointek Gernika Bizkaia	6	3	3	430	366	+64	9	Second place
27	D	(Italian Basketball Federation) GEAS Basket	6	3	3	427	389	+38	9	Second place
28	J	(French Federation of Basketball) Charnay Basket	6	3	3	453	454	−1	9	Second place
29	A	(Basketball Belgium) Castors Braine	6	4	2	443	397	+46	10	Third place
30	J	(Turkish Basketball Federation) Beşiktaş Boa	6	3	3	499	479	+20	9	Third place
31	C	(Israeli Basketball Association) Elitzur Ramla	6	3	3	413	405	+8	9	Third place
32	I	(Romanian Basketball Federation) CS Rapid București	6	3	3	425	423	+2	9	Third place

Source: FIBA
Rules for classification: 1) Points; 2) Points difference; 3) Points scored.

=== Bracket ===
Play-off Round 1
32	(Romanian Basketball Federation) CS Rapid București	78	87	165
1	(Turkish Basketball Federation) ÇİMSA ÇBK Mersin	82	95	177
17	(Lithuanian Basketball Federation) Kibirkštis-TOKS	87	54	141
16	(Italian Basketball Federation) Magnolia Basket Campobasso	70	60	130
25	(Polish Basketball Federation) MB Zagłębie Sosnowiec	83	80	163
8	(German Basketball Federation) Rutronik Stars Keltern	75	79	154
24	(Hellenic Basketball Federation) Panathinaikos AC	85	69	154
9	(Basketball Federation of Serbia) KKZ Crvena zvezda	76	68	144
29	(Basketball Belgium) Castors Braine	80	91	171
4	(Polish Basketball Federation) VBW Gdynia	73	54	127
20	(Czech Basketball Federation) Žabiny Brno	51	81	132
13	(Polish Basketball Federation) LOTTO AZS UMCS Lublin	92	58	150
28	(French Federation of Basketball) Charnay Basket	63	55	118
5	(French Federation of Basketball) BLMA	55	70	125
21	(Czech Basketball Federation) KP Brno	66	69	135
12	(Basketball Belgium) Kangoeroes Basket Mechelen	72	85	157
31	(Israeli Basketball Association) Elitzur Ramla	86	80	166
2	(Hellenic Basketball Federation) Olympiacos SFP	93	75	168
18	(Polish Basketball Federation) Ślęza Wrocław	65	61	126
15	(Spanish Basketball Federation) Movistar Estudiantes	62	72	134
26	(Spanish Basketball Federation) Lointek Gernika Bizkaia	62	61	123
7	(Hungarian Basketball Federation) NKA Universitas PEAC	43	78	121
23	(French Federation of Basketball) UFAB 49	67	75	142
10	(French Federation of Basketball) Villeneuve-d'Ascq LM	95	67	162
30	(Turkish Basketball Federation) Beşiktaş Boa	106	59	165
3	(Hungarian Basketball Federation) Sopron Basket	90	80	170
19	(Spanish Basketball Federation) Hozono Global Jairis	75	51	126
14	(Hellenic Basketball Federation) Athinaikos Qualco	80	73	153
27	(Italian Basketball Federation) GEAS Basket	62	60	122
6	(Spanish Basketball Federation) Baxi Ferrol	81	66	147
22	(Turkish Basketball Federation) Emlak Konut SK	78	59	137
11	(Spanish Basketball Federation) Perfumerias Avenida	81	71	152

Round of 16
1	(Turkish Basketball Federation) ÇİMSA ÇBK Mersin	87	84	171
17	(Lithuanian Basketball Federation) Kibirkštis-TOKS	67	65	132
25	(Polish Basketball Federation) MB Zagłębie Sosnowiec	49	94	143
24	(Hellenic Basketball Federation) Panathinaikos AC	76	93	169
29	(Basketball Belgium) Castors Braine	67	59	126
13	(Polish Basketball Federation) LOTTO AZS UMCS Lublin	77	68	145
5	(French Federation of Basketball) BLMA	80	57	137
12	(Basketball Belgium) Kangoeroes Basket Mechelen	66	59	125
2	(Hellenic Basketball Federation) Olympiacos SFP	86	68	154
15	(Spanish Basketball Federation) Movistar Estudiantes	85	72	157
26	(Spanish Basketball Federation) Lointek Gernika Bizkaia	62	81	143
10	(French Federation of Basketball) Villeneuve-d'Ascq LM	85	83	168
3	(Hungarian Basketball Federation) Sopron Basket	72	61	133
14	(Hellenic Basketball Federation) Athinaikos Qualco	81	71	152
6	(Spanish Basketball Federation) Baxi Ferrol	58	57	115
11	(Spanish Basketball Federation) Perfumerias Avenida	86	79	165

Quarterfinals
1	(Turkish Basketball Federation) ÇİMSA ÇBK Mersin	91	71	162
24	(Hellenic Basketball Federation) Panathinaikos AC	87	57	144
13	(Polish Basketball Federation) LOTTO AZS UMCS Lublin	43	82	125
5	(French Federation of Basketball) BLMA	67	78	145
15	(Spanish Basketball Federation) Movistar Estudiantes	73	70	143
10	(French Federation of Basketball) Villeneuve-d'Ascq LM	71	80	151
14	(Hellenic Basketball Federation) Athinaikos Qualco	65	79	144
11	(Spanish Basketball Federation) Perfumerias Avenida	71	68	139

Semifinals
1	(Turkish Basketball Federation) ÇİMSA ÇBK Mersin	70	86	156
5	(French Federation of Basketball) BLMA	68	60	128
10	(French Federation of Basketball) Villeneuve-d'Ascq LM	56	78	134
14	(Hellenic Basketball Federation) Athinaikos Qualco	69	70	139

Final
1	(Turkish Basketball Federation) ÇİMSA ÇBK Mersin	85	75	160
14	(Hellenic Basketball Federation) Athinaikos Qualco	80	77	157

=== Play-off Round 1 ===
The first legs were played on 10 and 11 December, and the second legs were played on 17 and 18 December 2025.

Team 1	Agg.	Team 2	1st leg	2nd leg
CS Rapid București (Romania)	165–177	(Turkey) ÇİMSA ÇBK Mersin	78–82	87–95
Kibirkštis-TOKS (Lithuania)	141–130	(Italy) Magnolia Basket Campobasso	87–70	54–60
MB Zagłębie Sosnowiec (Poland)	163–154	(Germany) Rutronik Stars Keltern	83–75	80–79
Panathinaikos AC (Greece)	154–144	(Serbia) KKZ Crvena zvezda	85–76	69–68
Castors Braine (Belgium)	171–127	(Poland) VBW Gdynia	80–73	91–54
Žabiny Brno (Czech Republic)	132–150	(Poland) LOTTO AZS UMCS Lublin	51–92	81–58
Charnay Basket (France)	118–125	(France) BLMA	63–55	55–70
KP Brno (Czech Republic)	135–157	(Belgium) Kangoeroes Basket Mechelen	66–72	69–85
Elitzur Ramla (Israel)	166–168	(Greece) Olympiacos SFP	86–93	80–75
Ślęza Wrocław (Poland)	126–134	(Spain) Movistar Estudiantes	65–62	61–72
Lointek Gernika Bizkaia (Spain)	123–121	(Hungary) NKA Universitas PEAC	62–43	61–78
UFAB 49 (France)	142–162	(France) Villeneuve-d'Ascq LM	67–95	75–67
Beşiktaş Boa (Turkey)	165–170	(Hungary) Sopron Basket	106–90	59–80
Hozono Global Jairis (Spain)	126–153	(Greece) Athinaikos Qualco	75–80	51–73
GEAS Basket (Italy)	122–147	(Spain) Baxi Ferrol	62–81	60–66
Emlak Konut SK (Turkey)	137–152	(Spain) Perfumerias Avenida	78–81	59–71

=== Round of 16 ===
The first legs were played on 14 and 15 January, and the second legs were played on 21 and 22 January 2026.

Team 1	Agg.	Team 2	1st leg	2nd leg
Kibirkštis-TOKS (Lithuania)	132–171	(Turkey) ÇİMSA ÇBK Mersin	67–87	65–84
MB Zagłębie Sosnowiec (Poland)	143–169	(Greece) Panathinaikos AC	49–76	94–93
Castors Braine (Belgium)	126–145	(Poland) LOTTO AZS UMCS Lublin	67–77	59–68
Kangoeroes Basket Mechelen (Belgium)	125–137	(France) BLMA	66–80	59–57
Movistar Estudiantes (Spain)	157–154	(Greece) Olympiacos SFP	85–86	72–68
Lointek Gernika Bizkaia (Spain)	143–168	(France) Villeneuve-d'Ascq LM	62–85	81–83
Athinaikos Qualco (Greece)	153–133	(Hungary) Sopron Basket	81–72	71–61
Perfumerias Avenida (Spain)	165–115	(Spain) Baxi Ferrol	86–58	79–57

=== Quarter-finals ===
The first legs were played on 5 February, and the second legs were played on 12 February 2026.

Team 1	Agg.	Team 2	1st leg	2nd leg
Panathinaikos AC (Greece)	144–162	(Turkey) ÇİMSA ÇBK Mersin	87–91	57–71
LOTTO AZS UMCS Lublin (Poland)	125–145	(France) BLMA	43–67	82–78
Movistar Estudiantes (Spain)	143–151	(France) Villeneuve-d'Ascq LM	73–71	70–80
Athinaikos Qualco (Greece)	144–139	(Spain) Perfumerias Avenida	65–71	79–68

=== Semi-finals ===
The first legs were played on 26 February, and the second legs were played on 4 March 2026.

Team 1	Agg.	Team 2	1st leg	2nd leg
BLMA (France)	128–156	(Turkey) ÇİMSA ÇBK Mersin	68–70	60–86
Athinaikos Qualco (Greece)	139–134	(France) Villeneuve-d'Ascq LM	69–56	70–78

=== Final ===
The first leg was played on 2 April, and the second leg was played on 9 April 2026.

Team 1	Agg.	Team 2	1st leg	2nd leg
Athinaikos Qualco (Greece)	157–160	(Turkey) ÇİMSA ÇBK Mersin	80–85	77–75

2025–26 EuroCup Women champions

ÇİMSA ÇBK Mersin
(1st title)

== Awards ==
=== Finals MVP ===
Player	Team	Ref.
(Turkey) Kennedy Burke	(Turkey) ÇİMSA ÇBK Mersin	

=== MVP of the Month ===
Month	Player	Team	Ref.
October	(France) Sarah Cisse	(France) BLMA	
November	(Greece) Ioanna Chatzileonti	(Greece) Panathinaikos AC	
December	(United States) Kennedy Todd-Williams	(Belgium) Kangoeroes Basket Mechelen	
January	(United States) Sedona Prince	(Greece) Panathinaikos AC	
February	(Turkey) Kennedy Burke	(Turkey) ÇİMSA ÇBK Mersin	
March	(Turkey) Kennedy Burke	(Turkey) ÇİMSA ÇBK Mersin	

=== MVP of the Round ===
==== Regular season ====
Round	PG	SG	SF	PF	C	Ref.
1	(Italy) Emma Giacchetti ( (Italy) Magnolia Basket Campobasso)	(Croatia) Shavonte Zellous ( (Spain) Perfumerías Avenida)	(United States) Khadijiah Cave ( (Spain) Perfumerías Avenida)	(Cameroon) Dulcy Fankam ( (Serbia) KKZ Crvena zvezda)	(Spain) Astou Ndour-Fall ( (Turkey) Emlak Konut SK)	
2	(North Macedonia) Andjelika Mitrashinovikj ( (Switzerland) BCF Elfic Fribourg)	(Spain) Blanca Millán ( (Spain) Baxi Ferrol)	(Slovakia) Miroslava Mištinová ( (Romania) CS Rapid București)	(United Kingdom) Mikiah Herbert Harrigan ( (Israel) Elitzur Ramla)	(Greece) Mariella Fasoula ( (Turkey) Beşiktaş Boa)	
3	(United States) Feyonda Fitzgerald ( (Greece) Panathinaikos AC)	(United States) Alexis Prince ( (Greece) Athinaikos Qualco)	(Czech Republic) Kateřina Galíčková ( (Czech Republic) Žabiny Brno)	(France) Sarah Cisse ( (France) BLMA)	(Nigeria) Nneka Ezeigbo ( (Spain) Movistar Estudiantes)	
4	(Belgium) Alicia Courthiau ( (Belgium) Castors Braine)	(Germany) Alexandra Wilke ( (Germany) Rutronik Stars Keltern)	(United States) Javyn Nicholson ( (Belgium) Kangoeroes Basket Mechelen)	(Ukraine) Miriam Uro-Nilie ( (Switzerland) Nyon Basket Feminin)	(Spain) Astou Ndour-Fall ( (Turkey) Emlak Konut SK)	
5	(Hungary) Réka Dombai ( (Hungary) TARR KSC Szekszárd)	(Lithuania) Kamilė Nacickaitė ( (Lithuania) Kibirkštis-TOKS)	(Hungary) Beatrix Mérész ( (Romania) ACS Sepsi SIC)	(United States) Elizabeth Elliott ( (Bulgaria) Beroe Stara Zagora)	(Greece) Ioanna Chatzileonti ( (Greece) Panathinaikos AC)	
6	(United States) Nia Clouden ( (Switzerland) BCF Elfic Fribourg)	(France) Lisa Berkani ( (Spain) Movistar Estudiantes)	(Netherlands) Maud Huijbens ( (Germany) Rutronik Stars Keltern)	(Switzerland) Lin Schwarz ( (Slovakia) Piešťanské Čajky)	(United States) Sedona Prince ( (Greece) Panathinaikos AC)	

==== Playoffs ====
Play-off Round 1

Round	PG	SG	SF	PF	C	Ref.
First leg	(Australia) Sami Whitcomb ( (Turkey) Beşiktaş Boa)	(United States) Alexis Prince ( (Greece) Athinaikos Qualco)	(Serbia) Dragana Stanković ( (Poland) AZS UMCS Lublin)	(Spain) Astou Ndour-Fall ( (Turkey) Emlak Konut SK)	(Greece) Mariella Fasoula ( (Turkey) Beşiktaş Boa)	
Second leg	(United States) Sydney Taylor ( (Poland) MB Zagłębie Sosnowiec)	(Bulgaria) Gergana Ivanova ( (Belgium) Castors Braine)	(United States) Kennedy Todd-Williams ( (Belgium) Kangoeroes Basket Mechelen)	(United States) Madison Scott ( (Italy) GEAS Basket)	(Germany) Luisa Geiselsöder ( (Turkey) ÇİMSA ÇBK Mersin)	

Round of 16

Round	PG	SG	SF	PF	C	Ref.
First leg	(United States) Feyonda Fitzgerald ( (Greece) Panathinaikos AC)	(Turkey) Kennedy Burke ( (Turkey) ÇİMSA ÇBK Mersin)	(Germany) Frieda Bühner ( (Spain) Movistar Estudiantes)	(France) Emmanuelle Tahane ( (France) Villeneuve-d'Ascq LM)	(United States) Sedona Prince ( (Greece) Panathinaikos AC)	
Second leg	(United States) Sydney Taylor ( (Poland) MB Zagłębie Sosnowiec)	(United States) Nausia Woolfolk ( (Greece) Olympiacos SFP)	(Turkey) Kennedy Burke ( (Turkey) ÇİMSA ÇBK Mersin)	(Greece) Artemis Spanou ( (Greece) Panathinaikos AC)	(United States) Sedona Prince ( (Greece) Panathinaikos AC)	

Quarterfinals

Round	PG	SG	SF	PF	C	Ref.
First leg	(United States) Alexis Peterson ( (France) Villeneuve-d'Ascq LM)	(Spain) Iyana Martín ( (Spain) Perfumerías Avenida)	(Germany) Frieda Bühner ( (Spain) Movistar Estudiantes)	(Greece) Artemis Spanou ( (Greece) Panathinaikos AC)	(United States) Sedona Prince ( (Greece) Panathinaikos AC)	
Second leg	(United States) Alexis Peterson ( (France) Villeneuve-d'Ascq LM)	(United Kingdom) Holly Winterburn ( (Greece) Athinaikos Qualco)	(Turkey) Kennedy Burke ( (Turkey) ÇİMSA ÇBK Mersin)	(France) Nell Angloma ( (France) BLMA)	(United States) Sedona Prince ( (Greece) Panathinaikos AC)	

Semifinals

Round	PG	SG	SF	PF	C	Ref.
First leg	(Turkey) Kennedy Burke ( (Turkey) ÇİMSA ÇBK Mersin)	(Lithuania) Laura Juškaitė ( (Turkey) ÇİMSA ÇBK Mersin)	(Serbia) Ivana Raca ( (Greece) Athinaikos Qualco)	(France) Emmanuelle Tahane ( (France) Villeneuve-d'Ascq LM)	(France) Ana Tadić ( (Greece) Athinaikos Qualco)	
Second leg	(United States) Alexis Peterson ( (France) Villeneuve-d'Ascq LM)	(Ukraine) Alina Iagupova ( (Turkey) ÇİMSA ÇBK Mersin)	(Turkey) Kennedy Burke ( (Turkey) ÇİMSA ÇBK Mersin)	(United States) Alexis Prince ( (Greece) Athinaikos Qualco)	(Lithuania) Eglė Šventoraitė ( (Turkey) ÇİMSA ÇBK Mersin)	

== See also ==
- 2025–26 EuroLeague Women
- 2025–26 EuroLeague Women regular season
- 2025–26 EuroLeague Women qualification round
- 2025 FIBA Europe SuperCup Women
- 2025–26 EuroCup Basketball
