= 2022–23 EuroCup Women =

EuroCup Women
- Season: 2022–23
- Teams: Competition proper: 48; Total: 57

Finals
- Champions: (France) LDLC ASVEL Féminin
- Runners-up: (Turkey) Galatasaray Cagdas Factoring
- Semifinalists: (Italy) Umana Reyer Venezia (France) Villeneuve-d'Ascq LM
- Final Four MVP: (France) Marine Johannès

The 2022–23 EuroCup Women was the 21st edition of FIBA Europe's second-tier international competition for women's basketball clubs under such name.

== Teams ==
Regular season
Conference 1		Conference 2	
(Turkey) Galatasaray Cagdas Factoring (5th)	(Serbia) Crvena zvezda MTS ^{EL} (1st)	(France) LDLC ASVEL Féminin (2nd)	(Belgium) Basket Namur Capitale (3rd)
(Turkey) OGM Ormanspor (3rd)	(Poland) InvestInTheWest Enea Gorzów (4th)	(Italy) Umana Reyer Venezia (4th)	(Czech Republic) KP Brno (4th)
(Romania) ACS Sepsi SIC ^{EL} (1st)	(Greece) Panathinaikos AC (2nd)	(France) Flammes Carolo Basket (5th)	(United Kingdom) London Lions (1st)
(Poland) AZS UMCS Lublin (2nd)	(Slovakia) Piešťanské Čajky (1st)	(France) Villeneuve d'Ascq LM ^{EL} (3rd)	(Spain) Casademont Zaragoza (5th)
(Turkey) Nesibe Aydın (4th)	(Turkey) Bursa Uludag Basketbol (7th)	(Belgium) Mithra Castors Braine (2nd)	(France) Angers (7th)
(Poland) VBW Arka Gdynia (3rd)	(Israel) Maccabi Bnot Ashdod (2nd)	(France) Roche Vendée Basket Club (6th)	(Germany) Rutronik Stars Keltern (6th)
(Hungary) NKA Universitas PEAC (4th)	(Lithuania) Kibirkštis (2nd)	(Switzerland) BCF Elfic Fribourg (1st)	(Spain) IDK Euskotren (6th)
(Turkey) Botaş Spor ^{EL} (6th)	(Bulgaria) Beroe (1st)	(Czech Republic) Žabiny Brno (2nd)	(Portugal) SL Benfica (1st)
(Israel) Elitzur Landco Ramla ^{EL} (1st)	(Romania) FCC UAV Arad (2nd)	(Spain) Movistar Estudiantes (7th)	(Luxembourg) T71 Diddeleng (1st)
(Hungary) Uni Győr (5th)		(Spain) Cadí La Seu (4th)	(Croatia) ŽKK Ragusa (1st)
Qualification round
Conference 1		Conference 2	
(Turkey) Hatay BB Spor (10th)	(Slovakia) Slavia Banská Bystrica (4th)	(France) BLMA (8th)	(Belgium) Phantoms Basket Boom (5th)
(Poland) Polskie Przetwory Bydgoszcz (6th)	(Greece) Esperides Kallitheas (3rd)	(Spain) Lointek Gernika Bizkaia (8th)	(Portugal) Sportiva Azoris Hotels (2nd)
(Hungary) Ludovika-FCSM Csata (8th)	(Greece) Eleftheria Moschatou (4th)	(Italy) Dinamo Banco di Sardegna (10th)	(Croatia) Plamen Požega (2nd)
(Israel) Elitzur Holon (8th)	(Greece) Dafni Agiou Dimitriou (5th)	(Luxembourg) BBC Gréngewald Hueschtert (4th)	
(Israel) Ramat Hasharon (5th)	(Greece) Chania (6th)	(Belgium) House of Talents Spurs (6th)	

== Schedule ==
Phase	Round	Dates
Draw		15 July 2022
Qualifying round	First leg	5–7 October 2022
Qualifying round	Second leg	12–13 October 2022
Regular season	Gameday 1	26–27 October 2022
Regular season	Gameday 2	2–3 November 2022
Regular season	Gameday 3	9–10 November 2022
Regular season	Gameday 4	16 November 2022
Regular season	Gameday 5	6–8 December 2022
Regular season	Gameday 6	13–15 December 2022
Play-Off Round 1	First leg	4–5 January 2023
Play-Off Round 1	Second leg	11–12 January 2023
Round of 16	First leg	25–26 January 2023
Round of 16	Second leg	1 February 2023
Quarter-Finals	First leg	23 February 2023
Quarter-Finals	Second leg	2 March 2023
Semifinals	First leg	16 March 2023
Semifinals	Second leg	23 March 2023
Final	First leg	5 April 2023
Final	Second leg	12 April 2023

== Qualification round ==
=== Conference 1 ===
Team 1	Agg.	Team 2	1st leg	2nd leg
Elitzur Holon (Israel)	168–153	(Greece) Esperides Kallitheas	78–73	90–80
Dafni Agiou Dimitriou (Greece)	103–179	(Turkey) Hatayspor	58–99	45–80
Chania (Greece)	113–169	(Poland) Basket 25 Bydgoszcz	59–85	54–84
Slavia Banská Bystrica (Slovakia)	132–130	(Greece) Eleftheria Moschatou	71–72	61–58
Ramat Hasharon (Israel)	141–130	(Hungary) Ludovika-FCSM Csata	70–62	71–68

=== Conference 2 ===
Team 1	Agg.	Team 2	1st leg	2nd leg
House of Talents Spurs (Belgium)	107–164	(Italy) Sassari	51–96	56–68
Plamen Požega (Croatia)	111–180	(France) Lattes Montpellier	53–68	58–112
Phantoms Basket Boom (Belgium)	113–194	(Spain) Lointek Gernika Bizkaia	62–102	51–92
Sportiva Azoris Hotels (Portugal)	103–124	(Luxembourg) BBC Gréngewald Hueschtert	49–52	54–72

== Regular season ==
=== Conference 1 ===
==== Group A ====
Pos	Team	Pld	W	L	PF	PA	PD	Pts	Qualification	PAN	LUB	CRV	RAM
1	(Greece) Panathinaikos AC	6	4	2	387	358	+29	10	Play-off Round 1	—	67–59	70–64	59–65
2	(Poland) AZS UMCS Lublin	6	4	2	393	357	+36	10	Play-off Round 1	38–51	—	83–57	62–53
3	(Serbia) Crvena zvezda MTS	6	3	3	421	447	−26	9	Play-off Round 1	70–64	63–82	—	88–87
4	(Israel) Ramat Hasharon	6	1	5	394	433	−39	7		62–76	66–69	61–79	—

Source: FIBA.com
Rules for classification: 1) Points; 2) Head-to-head record; 3) Head-to-head point differential. 4) General point differential 5) Points scored

==== Group B ====
Pos	Team	Pld	W	L	PF	PA	PD	Pts	Qualification	PEA	ELI	HAT	BER
1	(Hungary) NKA Universitas PEAC	6	5	1	441	362	+79	11	Play-off Round 1	—	78–58	64–63	83–57
2	(Israel) Elitzur Landco Ramla	6	5	1	490	408	+82	11	Play-off Round 1	69–58	—	66–48	108–77
3	(Turkey) Hatay BB Spor	6	1	5	415	449	−34	7		56–64	74–88	—	93–73
4	(Bulgaria) Beroe	6	1	5	433	560	−127	7		59–94	73–101	94–81	—

Source: FIBA.com
Rules for classification: 1) Points; 2) Head-to-head record; 3) Head-to-head point differential. 4) General point differential 5) Points scored

==== Group C ====
Pos	Team	Pld	W	L	PF	PA	PD	Pts	Qualification	GOR	GAL	PIE	BYS
1	(Poland) InvestInTheWest Enea Gorzów	6	5	1	474	374	+100	11	Play-off Round 1	—	78–71	71–56	103–59
2	(Turkey) Galatasaray Cagdas Factoring	6	4	2	456	392	+64	10	Play-off Round 1	68–66	—	79–55	94–52
3	(Slovakia) Piešťanské Čajky	6	3	3	416	389	+27	9	Play-off Round 1	68–70	71–63	—	81–55
4	(Slovakia) Slavia Banská Bystrica	6	0	6	339	530	−191	6		52–86	70–81	51–85	—

Source: FIBA.com
Rules for classification: 1) Points; 2) Head-to-head record; 3) Head-to-head point differential. 4) General point differential 5) Points scored

==== Group D ====
Pos	Team	Pld	W	L	PF	PA	PD	Pts	Qualification	ORM	GDY	BYD	ARA
1	(Turkey) OGM Ormanspor	6	5	1	463	396	+67	11	Play-off Round 1	—	69–61	109–72	85–59
2	(Poland) VBW Arka Gdynia	6	4	2	450	390	+60	10	Play-off Round 1	60–66	—	86–78	87–53
3	(Poland) Polskie Przetwory Bydgoszcz	6	2	4	430	485	−55	8		80–66	61–84	—	89–53
4	(Romania) FCC UAV Arad	6	1	5	379	451	−72	7		64–68	63–72	87–50	—

Source: FIBA.com
Rules for classification: 1) Points; 2) Head-to-head record; 3) Head-to-head point differential. 4) General point differential 5) Points scored

==== Group E ====
Pos	Team	Pld	W	L	PF	PA	PD	Pts	Qualification	SEP	ELI	NES	BUR
1	(Romania) ACS Sepsi SIC	6	6	0	490	403	+87	12	Play-off Round 1	—	76–75	80–71	92–58
2	(Israel) Elitzur Holon	6	4	2	457	427	+30	10	Play-off Round 1	71–83	—	74–59	86–74
3	(Turkey) Nesibe Aydın	6	2	4	394	417	−23	8	Play-off Round 1	56–70	67–72	—	74–72
4	(Turkey) Bursa Uludag Basketbol	6	0	6	393	487	−94	6		72–89	68–79	49–67	—

Source: FIBA.com
Rules for classification: 1) Points; 2) Head-to-head record; 3) Head-to-head point differential. 4) General point differential 5) Points scored

==== Group F ====
Pos	Team	Pld	W	L	PF	PA	PD	Pts	Qualification	GYO	MAC	KIB	BOT
1	(Hungary) Uni Győr	6	4	2	439	426	+13	10	Play-off Round 1	—	95–81	53–58	72–65
2	(Israel) Maccabi Bnot Ashdod	6	3	3	457	445	+12	9	Play-off Round 1	72–73	—	85–75	66–77
3	(Lithuania) Kibirkštis	6	3	3	410	424	−14	9	Play-off Round 1	81–76	64–76	—	63–70
4	(Turkey) Botaş Spor	6	2	4	406	417	−11	8		69–70	61–77	64–69	—

Source: FIBA.com
Rules for classification: 1) Points; 2) Head-to-head record; 3) Head-to-head point differential. 4) General point differential 5) Points scored

=== Conference 2 ===
==== Group G ====
Pos	Team	Pld	W	L	PF	PA	PD	Pts	Qualification	BEN	FRI	NAM	DUD
1	(Portugal) SL Benfica	6	5	1	411	379	+32	11	Play-off Round 1	—	69–63	63–51	84–69
2	(Switzerland) BCF Elfic Fribourg	6	4	2	430	402	+28	10	Play-off Round 1	65–67	—	65–52	80–74
3	(Belgium) Basket Namur Capitale	6	2	4	380	371	+9	8	Play-off Round 1	72–56	56–63	—	60–72
4	(Luxembourg) T71 Diddeleng	6	1	5	410	479	−69	7		59–72	84–94	52–89	—

Source: FIBA.com
Rules for classification: 1) Points; 2) Head-to-head record; 3) Head-to-head point differential. 4) General point differential 5) Points scored

==== Group H ====
Pos	Team	Pld	W	L	PF	PA	PD	Pts	Qualification	VEN	GER	EST	KEL
1	(Italy) Umana Reyer Venezia	6	6	0	496	380	+116	12	Play-off Round 1	—	68–65	85–69	87–53
2	(Spain) Lointek Gernika Bizkaia	6	3	3	392	389	+3	9	Play-off Round 1	59–76	—	66–54	78–59
3	(Spain) Movistar Estudiantes	6	3	3	391	396	−5	9	Play-off Round 1	69–86	63–51	—	67–53
4	(Germany) Rutronik Stars Keltern	6	0	6	354	468	−114	6		65–94	69–73	55–69	—

Source: FIBA.com
Rules for classification: 1) Points; 2) Head-to-head record; 3) Head-to-head point differential. 4) General point differential 5) Points scored

==== Group I ====
Pos	Team	Pld	W	L	PF	PA	PD	Pts	Qualification	ZAR	CAD	BRA	GRE
1	(Spain) Casademont Zaragoza	6	6	0	464	360	+104	12	Play-off Round 1	—	56–55	73–69	102–57
2	(Spain) Cadí La Seu	6	3	3	400	348	+52	9	Play-off Round 1	58–71	—	63–66	71–47
3	(Belgium) Castors Braine	6	3	3	447	398	+49	9	Play-off Round 1	67–81	54–63	—	115–66
4	(Luxembourg) BBC Gréngewald	6	0	6	330	535	−205	6		54–81	54–90	52–76	—

Source: FIBA.com
Rules for classification: 1) Points; 2) Head-to-head record; 3) Head-to-head point differential. 4) General point differential 5) Points scored

==== Group J ====
Pos	Team	Pld	W	L	PF	PA	PD	Pts	Qualification	VIL	LON	SAS	VEN
1	(France) Villeneuve-d'Ascq LM	6	5	1	461	349	+112	11	Play-off Round 1	—	80–59	68–48	81–50
2	(United Kingdom) London Lions	6	3	3	439	440	−1	9	Play-off Round 1	67–60	—	75–82	90–79
3	(Italy) Dinamo Banco di Sardegna	6	2	4	397	437	−40	8	Play-off Round 1	56–77	63–73	—	77–65
4	(France) Roche Vendée Basket Club	6	2	4	418	489	−71	8		69–95	76–75	79–71	—

Source: FIBA.com
Rules for classification: 1) Points; 2) Head-to-head record; 3) Head-to-head point differential. 4) General point differential 5) Points scored

==== Group K ====
Pos	Team	Pld	W	L	PF	PA	PD	Pts	Qualification	MON	ASV	IDK	BRN
1	(France) BLMA	6	6	0	477	431	+46	12	Play-off Round 1	—	80–74	88–78	84–72
2	(France) LDLC ASVEL Féminin	6	4	2	377	353	+24	10	Play-off Round 1	53–62	—	76–64	20–0
3	(Spain) IDK Euskotren	6	1	5	441	467	−26	7		67–73	70–71	—	91–80
4	(Czech Republic) Žabiny Brno	6	1	5	395	439	−44	6		87–90	77–83	79–71	—

Source: FIBA.com
Rules for classification: 1) Points; 2) Head-to-head record; 3) Head-to-head point differential. 4) General point differential 5) Points scored

==== Group L ====
Pos	Team	Pld	W	L	PF	PA	PD	Pts	Qualification	FLA	ANG	BRN	DUB
1	(France) Flammes Carolo Basket	6	5	1	550	355	+195	11	Play-off Round 1	—	89–60	120–46	115–60
2	(France) Angers	6	5	1	483	357	+126	11	Play-off Round 1	84–63	—	89–64	90–42
3	(Czech Republic) KP Brno	6	2	4	341	485	−144	8		58–85	44–68	—	71–68
4	(Croatia) Ragusa Dubrovnik	6	0	6	327	504	−177	6		47–78	55–92	55–58	—

Source: FIBA.com
Rules for classification: 1) Points; 2) Head-to-head record; 3) Head-to-head point differential. 4) General point differential 5) Points scored

=== Ranking of third-placed teams ===
==== Conference 1 ====
Pos	Grp	Team	Pld	W	L	PF	PA	PD	Pts	Qualification
1	C	(Slovakia) Piešťanské Čajky	6	3	3	416	389	+27	9	Play-off Round 1
2	F	(Lithuania) Kibirkštis	6	3	3	410	424	−14	9	Play-off Round 1
3	A	(Serbia) Crvena zvezda MTS	6	3	3	421	447	−26	9	Play-off Round 1
4	E	(Turkey) Nesibe Aydın	6	2	4	394	417	−23	8	Play-off Round 1
5	D	(Poland) Polskie Przetwory Bydgoszcz	6	2	4	430	485	−55	8	
6	B	(Turkey) Hatay BB Spor	6	1	5	415	449	−34	7	

Source: FIBA.com
Rules for classification: 1) Points; 2) Points difference; 3) Points scored.

==== Conference 2 ====
Pos	Grp	Team	Pld	W	L	PF	PA	PD	Pts	Qualification
1	I	(Belgium) Castors Braine	6	3	3	447	398	+49	9	Play-off Round 1
2	H	(Spain) Movistar Estudiantes	6	3	3	391	396	−5	9	Play-off Round 1
3	G	(Belgium) Basket Namur Capitale	6	2	4	380	371	+9	8	Play-off Round 1
4	J	(Italy) Dinamo Banco di Sardegna	6	2	4	397	437	−40	8	Play-off Round 1
5	L	(Czech Republic) KP Brno	6	2	4	341	485	−144	8	
6	K	(Spain) IDK Euskotren	6	1	5	441	467	−26	7	

Source: FIBA.com
Rules for classification: 1) Points; 2) Points difference; 3) Points scored.

=== Seeding ===
Seed	Grp	Team	Pld	W	L	PF	PA	PD	Pts
1	H	(Italy) Umana Reyer Venezia	6	6	0	496	380	+116	12
2	I	(Spain) Casademont Zaragoza	6	6	0	464	360	+104	12
3	E	(Romania) ACS Sepsi SIC	6	6	0	490	403	+87	12
4	K	(France) BLMA	6	6	0	477	431	+46	12
5	L	(France) Flammes Carolo Basket	6	5	1	550	355	+195	11
6	L	(France) Angers	6	5	1	483	357	+126	11
7	J	(France) Villeneuve-d'Ascq LM	6	5	1	461	349	+112	11
8	C	(Poland) InvestInTheWest Enea Gorzów	6	5	1	474	374	+100	11
9	B	(Israel) Elitzur Landco Ramla	6	5	1	490	408	+82	11
10	B	(Hungary) NKA Universitas PEAC	6	5	1	441	362	+79	11
11	D	(Turkey) OGM Ormanspor	6	5	1	463	396	+67	11
12	G	(Portugal) SL Benfica	6	5	1	411	379	+32	11
13	C	(Turkey) Galatasaray Cagdas Factoring	6	4	2	456	392	+64	10
14	D	(Poland) VBW Arka Gdynia	6	4	2	450	390	+60	10
15	A	(Poland) AZS UMCS Lublin	6	4	2	393	357	+36	10
16	E	(Israel) Elitzur Holon	6	4	2	457	427	+30	10
17	A	(Greece) Panathinaikos AC	6	4	2	387	358	+29	10
18	G	(Switzerland) BCF Elfic Fribourg	6	4	2	430	402	+28	10
19	K	(France) LDLC ASVEL Féminin	6	4	2	377	353	+24	10
20	F	(Hungary) Uni Győr	6	4	2	439	426	+13	10
21	I	(Spain) Cadí La Seu	6	3	3	400	348	+52	9
22	I	(Belgium) Castors Braine	6	3	3	447	398	+49	9
23	C	(Slovakia) Piešťanské Čajky	6	3	3	416	389	+27	9
24	F	(Israel) Maccabi Bnot Ashdod	6	3	3	457	445	+12	9
25	H	(Spain) Lointek Gernika Bizkaia	6	3	3	392	389	+3	9
26	J	(United Kingdom) London Lions	6	3	3	439	440	−1	9
27	H	(Spain) Movistar Estudiantes	6	3	3	391	396	−5	9
28	F	(Lithuania) Kibirkštis	6	3	3	410	424	−14	9
29	A	(Serbia) Crvena zvezda MTS	6	3	3	421	447	−26	9
30	G	(Belgium) Basket Namur Capitale	6	2	4	380	371	+9	8
31	E	(Turkey) Nesibe Aydın	6	2	4	394	417	−23	8
32	J	(Italy) Dinamo Banco di Sardegna	6	2	4	397	437	−40	8

Source: FIBA.com
Rules for classification: 1) Points; 2) Points difference; 3) Points scored.

== Play-off Round 1 ==
Team 1	Agg.	Team 2	1st leg	2nd leg
Dinamo Banco di Sardegna (Italy)	150–165	(Italy) Umana Reyer Venezia	89–82	61–83
Nesibe Aydın (Turkey)	133–139	(Spain) Casademont Zaragoza	66–67	67–72
Basket Namur Capitale (Belgium)	118–183	(Romania) ACS Sepsi SIC	74–93	44–90
Crvena zvezda MTS (Serbia)	145–159	(France) BLMA	79–63	66–96
Kibirkštis (Lithuania)	124–150	(France) Flammes Carolo Basket	65–68	59–82
Movistar Estudiantes (Spain)	119–130	(France) Angers	55–65	64–65
London Lions (United Kingdom)	141–148	(France) Villeneuve-d'Ascq LM	77–71	64–77
Lointek Gernika Bizkaia (Spain)	136–146	(Poland) InvestInTheWest Enea Gorzów	79–78	57–68
Maccabi Bnot Ashdod (Israel)	126–174	(Israel) Elitzur Landco Ramla	80–92	46–82
Piešťanské Čajky (Slovakia)	119–131	(Hungary) NKA Universitas PEAC	62–68	57–63
Castors Braine (Belgium)	172–133	(Turkey) OGM Ormanspor	90–62	82–71
Cadí La Seu (Spain)	121–119	(Portugal) SL Benfica	62–53	59–66
Uni Győr (Hungary)	115–142	(Turkey) Galatasaray Cagdas Factoring	61–78	54–64
LDLC ASVEL Féminin (France)	177–134	(Poland) VBW Arka Gdynia	86–62	91–72
BCF Elfic Fribourg (Switzerland)	133–144	(Poland) AZS UMCS Lublin	68–73	65–71
Panathinaikos AC (Greece)	116–142	(Israel) Elitzur Holon	60–67	56–75

== Round of 16 ==
Team 1	Agg.	Team 2	1st leg	2nd leg
Elitzur Holon (Israel)	143–145	(Italy) Umana Reyer Venezia	83–68	60–77
AZS UMCS Lublin (Poland)	119–124	(Spain) Casademont Zaragoza	69–66	50–58
LDLC ASVEL Féminin (France)	178–159	(Romania) ACS Sepsi SIC	91–76	87–83
Galatasaray Cagdas Factoring (Turkey)	155–132	(France) BLMA	88–75	67–57
Cadí La Seu (Spain)	137–131	(France) Flammes Carolo Basket	72–54	65–77
Castors Braine (Belgium)	144–151	(France) Angers	61–62	83–89
NKA Universitas PEAC (Hungary)	110–148	(France) Villeneuve-d'Ascq LM	66–74	44–74
Elitzur Landco Ramla (Israel)	170–127	(Poland) InvestInTheWest Enea Gorzów	85–63	85–64

== Quarterfinals ==
Team 1	Agg.	Team 2	1st leg	2nd leg
Elitzur Landco Ramla (Israel)	128–134	(Italy) Umana Reyer Venezia	80–75	48–59
Villeneuve-d'Ascq LM (France)	140–133	(Spain) Casademont Zaragoza	84–68	56–65
LDLC ASVEL Féminin (France)	159–118	(France) Angers	88–58	71–60
Cadí La Seu (Spain)	126–161	(Turkey) Galatasaray Cagdas Factoring	61–86	65–75

== Semifinals ==
Team 1	Agg.	Team 2	1st leg	2nd leg
Galatasaray Cagdas Factoring (Turkey)	134–118	(Italy) Umana Reyer Venezia	74–49	60–69
LDLC ASVEL Féminin (France)	155–149	(France) Villeneuve-d'Ascq LM	84–80	71–69

== Final ==
Team 1	Agg.	Team 2	1st leg	2nd leg
LDLC ASVEL Féminin (France)	180–113	(Turkey) Galatasaray Cagdas Factoring	95–56	85–57

== See also ==
- 2022–23 EuroLeague Women
- 2022 FIBA Europe SuperCup Women
