= 2024–25 Basket Liga Kobiet =

Women's basketball league in Poland

Basket Liga Kobiet
- Season: 2024–25
- Dates: Regular season: 5 October 2024 – 9 March 2025; Play Out and Play Offs: 13 March – 12 April 2025
- Teams: 10

Regular season
- Season MVP: (United States) Robbi Ryan

Finals
- Champions: VBW Arka Gdynia (14th title)
- Runners-up: InvestInTheWest Enea Gorzow
- Finals MVP: (United States) Ruthy Hebard

Statistical leaders
Points	(Greece) Elena Tsineke	17.4
Rebounds	(Lithuania) Laura Miskiniene-Svaryte	12.1
Assists	(Poland) Barbora Wrzesiński	8.4
Steals	(United States) Agnieszka Skobel	2.5
Blocks	(Poland) Kamila Borkowska	2.3

The 2024–25 Basket Liga Kobiet was the 90th season of the top division women's basketball league in Poland since its establishment in 1930. It started in October 2024 with the first round of the regular season and ended in April 2025.

KGHM BC Polkowice were the defending champions.

VBW Arka Gdynia won their fourteenth title after beating InvestInTheWest Enea Gorzow in the final.

== Format ==
Each team plays each other twice. The top eight teams qualify for the play offs where every round is held as a best of five series.

== Regular season ==
Pos	Team	Pld	W	L	PF	PA	PD	Pts	Qualification
1	VBW Arka Gdynia	18	15	3	1408	1207	+201	33	Play Offs
2	1KS Ślęza Wrocław	18	13	5	1368	1181	+187	31	Play Offs
3	Polski-Cukier AZS UMCS Lublin	18	11	7	1495	1285	+210	29 (Note: Polski-Cukier AZS UMCS Lublin 163–160 MB Zagłębie Sosnowiec)	Play Offs
4	MB Zagłębie Sosnowiec	18	11	7	1409	1303	+106	29	Play Offs
5	Enea AZS Politechnika Poznań	18	10	8	1401	1305	+96	28	Play Offs
6	InvestInTheWest Enea Gorzow	18	8	10	1399	1327	+72	26 (Note: InvestInTheWest Enea Gorzow 180–121 KGHM BC Polkowice)	Play Offs
7	KGHM BC Polkowice (Note: KGHM BC Polkowice were supposed to play VBW Arka Gdynia on 28 December 2024. However, the game was given as a forfeit win to VBW Arka Gdynia and KGHM BC Polkowice received no losing point.)	18	9	9	1156	1615	−459	26	Play Offs
8	Energa Polski Cukier Toruń	18	6	12	1337	1451	−114	24	Play Offs
9	SKK Polonia Warszawa	18	4	14	1289	1385	−96	22	Relegation Play Off
10	KS Basket Bydgoszcz	18	3	15	1273	1476	−203	21	Relegation Play Off

Source: Basket Liga Kobiet
Rules for classification: 1) Points; 2) Points difference; 3) Points scored.

== Play offs ==
Quarterfinals
1	VBW Arka Gdynia	75	80	91	3
8	Energa Polski Cukier Toruń	59	61	79	0
4	MB Zagłębie Sosnowiec	78	76	58	66	3
5	Enea AZS Politechnika Poznań	77	64	67	61	1
2	1KS Ślęza Wrocław	108	104	105	3
7	KGHM BC Polkowice	33	34	48	0
3	Polski-Cukier AZS UMCS Lublin	67	97	71	87	1
6	InvestInTheWest Enea Gorzow	81	88	89	94	3

Semifinals
1	VBW Arka Gdynia	77	92	78	3
4	MB Zagłębie Sosnowiec	60	76	65	0
2	1KS Ślęza Wrocław	72	75	85	73	75	2
6	InvestInTheWest Enea Gorzow	87	65	61	81	78	3

Final
1	VBW Arka Gdynia	91	84	87	3
6	InvestInTheWest Enea Gorzow	80	57	71	0
Third place
2	1KS Ślęza Wrocław	83	70	2
4	MB Zagłębie Sosnowiec	64	54	0

Champions of Poland

VBW Arka Gdynia
Fourteenth title

== Relegation play off ==
Despite SKK Polonia Warszawa losing the play off, they were allowed to stay up.

Relegation play off
9	SKK Polonia Warszawa	75	75	150
10	KS Basket Bydgoszcz	61	96	157
