= 2026–27 Ligue Féminine de Basketball =

Women's basketball league in France

Ligue Féminine de Basketball
- Season: 2026–27
- Dates: Regular season: September 2026 – April 2027; Play Offs: April – May 2027
- Games played: 132 (Regular season); 15 (Play offs); 12 (Playdowns)
- Teams: 12

The 2026–27 Ligue Féminine de Basketball (or the 2026–27 La Boulangère Wonderligue for sponsorship reasons) is the 99th season of the top division women's basketball league in France, and the 28th edition since the creation of the LFB. It started in September 2026 with the first round of the regular season and will end in April 2027.

Basket Landes are the defending champions.

== Format ==
Each team plays each other twice. The top eight teams qualify for the play offs, where the quarterfinals and semifinals are held as a two legged aggregate tie while the final is played as a best of three series. The teams who don't reach the play offs advance to the play outs where one team will be relegated.

== Teams ==
=== Promotion and relegation (pre-season) ===
A total of 12 teams contest the league, including 11 sides from the 2025–26 season and one promoted from the 2025–26 Ligue 2.

On 6 May 2026, Roche Vendée were relegated after losing to ASVEL Féminin, thus securing an immediate return to Ligue 2. On 24 May 2026, La Tronche-Meylan were promoted to the top division after beating Montbrison in the final.

▲ Promoted from Ligue 2	▼ Relegated to Ligue 2
La Tronche-Meylan	Roche Vendée

=== Venues and locations ===
Location of teams within France

Team	City	Arena	Capacity	Colours
Angers 49	Angers	Salle Jean Bouin	3,000	
Basket Landes	Mont-de-Marsan	Salle Francois Mitterrand	3,000	
Tango Bourges Basket	Bourges	Palais des Sports du Prado	3,100	
Flammes Carolo Basket	Charleville-Mézières	L'Arena	2,960	
Charnay Basket	Charnay-lès-Mâcon	The Cosec	700	
La Tronche-Meylan	Meylan	Gymnase Charlaix-Maupertuis	300	
Landerneau Bretagne Basket	Landerneau	La Cimenterie	2,300	
Lattes Montpellier	Lattes	Palais des sports de Lattes	1,100	
ASVEL Féminin	Lyon	Gymnase Mado Bonnet	1,500	
Tarbes GB	Tarbes	Palais des Sports de l'Adour	1,800	
Toulouse Métropole Basket	Toulouse	Gymnase Compans Cafarelli	1,900	
Villeneuve d'Ascq	Villeneuve-d'Ascq	Le Palacium	1,800	

== League standings ==
Pos	Team	Pld	W	L	PF	PA	PD	Pts	Qualification
1	ASVEL Féminin	4	2	2	151	126	+25	6	Play Offs
2	Basket Landes	4	2	2	138	120	+18	6	Play Offs
3	Lattes Montpellier	4	2	2	173	160	+13	6	Play Offs
4	Flammes Carolo Basket	3	2	1	145	132	+13	5	Play Offs
5	Charnay Basket	3	2	1	165	155	+10	5	Play Offs
6	Tango Bourges Basket	3	2	1	164	157	+7	5	Play Offs
7	Angers 49	3	2	1	142	138	+4	5	Play Offs
8	Villeneuve d'Ascq	3	2	1	114	112	+2	5	Play Outs
9	Chartres Basket	3	2	1	146	155	−9	5	Play Outs
10	Landerneau Bretagne Basket	2	0	2	124	147	−23	2	Play Outs
11	La Tronche-Meylan	2	0	2	123	147	−24	2	Play Outs
12	Toulouse Métropole Basket	2	0	2	109	145	−36	2	Relegation to Ligue 2

Updated to match(es) played on 4 October 2026. Source: Standings
Rules for classification: 1) Points; 2) Points difference; 3) Points scored.
