= 2024–25 Lega Basket Femminile =

Women's basketball league in Italy

Lega Basket Femminile
- Season: 2024–25
- Dates: Regular season: 28 September 2024 – 27 March 2025; Play Offs: 5 April – 13 May 2025
- Teams: 11

Regular season
- Season MVP: (Nigeria) Pallas Kunaiyi-Akpannah
- Relegated: MEP Pellegrini Alpo

Finals
- Champions: Famila Beretta Schio (13th title)
- Runners-up: Umana Reyer Venezia
- Finals MVP: (France) Janelle Salaün

Statistical leaders
Points	(United States) Sparkle Taylor	19.0
Rebounds	(Ukraine) Tetiana Yurkevichus	12.8
Assists	(United States) Raelin D'Alie	6.8
Steals	(United States) Cornelia Fondren	2.9
Blocks	(Finland) Awak Kuier	1.1

The 2024–25 Lega Basket Femminile is the 94th season of the top division women's basketball league in Italy since its establishment in 1930. It starts in September 2024 with the first round of the regular season and ends in May 2025.

Famila Beretta Schio are the defending champions.

Famila Beretta Schio won their thirteenth title after beating Umana Reyer Venezia in the final.

== Format ==
Each team plays each other twice. The top eight teams qualify for the play offs, where the quarterfinals are played as a best of three series while the semifinals and final is played as a best of five series. The teams who don't reach the play offs advance to the relegation play offs where one team will be relegated.

OBG Roma, Virtus Bologna and Virtus Eirene Ragusa all withdrew from the league and were not replaced.

== Regular season ==
Pos	Team	Pld	W	L	PF	PA	PD	Pts	Qualification
1	Famila Beretta Schio	20	19	1	1635	1192	+443	39	Play Offs
2	Umana Reyer Venezia	20	18	2	1525	1132	+393	38	Play Offs
3	La Molisana Campobasso	20	14	6	1436	1182	+254	34	Play Offs
4	Autosped G BCC Derthona Basket	20	11	9	1321	1309	+12	31 (Note: Autosped G BCC Derthona Basket 2–0 Alama San Martino di Lupari)	Play Offs
5	Alama San Martino di Lupari	20	11	9	1370	1365	+5	31	Play Offs
6	GEAS Sesto San Giovanni	20	10	10	1477	1413	+64	30	Play Offs
7	E-Work Faenza	20	9	11	1310	1460	−150	29	Play Offs
8	O.ME.P.S. Battipaglia	20	6	14	1139	1367	−228	26 (Note: O.ME.P.S. Battipaglia 2–0 RMB Brixia Basket)	Play Offs
9	RMB Brixia Basket	20	6	14	1313	1513	−200	26	Relegation Play Offs
10	Dinamo Sassari	20	5	15	1287	1489	−202	25	Relegation Play Offs
11	MEP Pellegrini Alpo (R)	20	1	19	1260	1651	−391	21	Relegation Play Offs

Source: Lega Basket Femminile
Rules for classification: 1) Points; 2) Points difference; 3) Points scored.
(R) Relegated

== Play offs ==
Quarterfinals
1	Famila Beretta Schio	90	78	2
8	O.ME.P.S. Battipaglia	42	49	0
4	Autosped G BCC Derthona Basket	71	59	72	1
5	Alama San Martino di Lupari	65	70	82	2
2	Umana Reyer Venezia	99	67	2
7	E-Work Faenza	47	51	0
3	La Molisana Campobasso	70	90	2
6	GEAS Sesto San Giovanni	67	68	0

Semifinals
1	Famila Beretta Schio	92	86	53	3
5	Alama San Martino di Lupari	67	50	50	0
2	Umana Reyer Venezia	75	59	86	61	3
3	La Molisana Campobasso	66	61	79	59	1

Final
1	Famila Beretta Schio	72	86	57	67	73	3
2	Umana Reyer Venezia	62	79	67	73	61	2

Champions of Italy

Famila Beretta Schio
Thirteenth title

== Relegation play offs ==
The loser of the Relegation play offs gets relegated.

Semifinals					Final
					10	Dinamo Sassari	75	71	76	2
					11	MEP Pellegrini Alpo	65	82	67	1
9	RMB Brixia Basket	77	82	2	11	MEP Pellegrini Alpo	65	82	67	1
10	Dinamo Sassari	64	73	0
