= Robbi Ryan =

American basketball player (born 1997)

No. 21 – AZS UMCS Lublin
- Position: Guard
- League: Basket Liga Kobiet

Personal information
- Born: August 13, 1997 (age 29) Sheridan, Wyoming, U.S.
- Listed height: 5 ft 9 in (1.75 m)

Career information
- High school: Sheridan (Sheridan, Wyoming)
- College: Arizona State (2016–2020)
- WNBA draft: 2020: undrafted
- Playing career: 2021–present

Career history
- 2021–2022: Grindavík
- 2022–2023: Joondalup Wolves
- 2022–2023: Perth Lynx
- 2023–2024: Luleå Basket
- 2024: Rockingham Flames
- 2024–2025: Ślęza Wrocław
- 2025: Warwick Senators
- 2025–present: AZS UMCS Lublin

Career highlights
- NBL1 West champion (2024); Basket Liga Kobiet champion (2026); Basket Liga Kobiet Most Valuable Player (2025); NBL1 National Finals All-Star Five (2024); All-NBL1 West First Team (2022); NBL1 West Golden Hands (2022); All-Pac-12 (2020); Ms. Wyoming Basketball (2016)

Robbi Lynn Ryan (born August 13, 1997) is an American professional basketball player for AZS UMCS Lublin of the Polish Basket Liga Kobiet. She played college basketball for the Arizona State Sun Devils before starting her professional career with Grindavík in the Icelandic Úrvalsdeild kvenna.

== High school career ==
Ryan played basketball at Sheridan High School in Sheridan, Wyoming, where she was a four-time First Team All-State selection and two-time Gatorade Player of the Year for the State of Wyoming, and Ms. Wyoming Basketball in 2016.

== College career ==
Ryan played four years of college basketball for the Arizona State Sun Devils. She started 103 of 131 career games and finished her career with 1,127 points. In her senior season, she was named All-Pac-12.

== Professional career ==
In August 2021, Ryan signed with Grindavík in the Icelandic Úrvalsdeild kvenna. On November 24, she scored a season-high 38 points in a victory against Breiðablik.

In March 2022, Ryan signed with the Joondalup Wolves in Australia for the 2022 NBL1 West season.

On August 4, 2022, Ryan signed with the Perth Lynx in Australia for the 2022–23 WNBL season. She returned to the Wolves for the 2023 NBL1 West season.

On July 10, 2023, Ryan signed with Luleå Basket of the Swedish Basketligan dam.

In May 2024, Ryan joined the Rockingham Flames for the rest of the 2024 NBL1 West season. She helped the Flames reach the NBL1 West grand final, where she had 16 points, 11 rebounds and four assists in a 97–81 victory over the Cockburn Cougars to win the NBL1 West championship. At the 2024 NBL1 National Finals, she earned All-Star Five honours.

Ryan joined Ślęza Wrocław of the Polish Basket Liga Kobiet for the 2024–25 season. On January 20, 2025, she recorded a triple-double with 20 points, 11 rebounds and 10 assists in a 70–67 win over Polonia Warsaw. She was named league MVP and led the team to the bronze medal in the play-offs. In 28 games, she averaged 17.4 points, 6.3 rebounds and 4.6 assists per game.

On June 6, 2025, Ryan signed with the Warwick Senators for the rest of the 2025 NBL1 West season. She played just three games due to injury.

Ryan joined AZS UMCS Lublin for the 2025–26 Polish League season.

== Personal life ==
As of August 2024, Ryan's partner is fellow basketball player and teammate, Emma Gandini.
