= 2024–25 Ligue Féminine de Basketball =

Women's basketball league in France

Ligue Féminine de Basketball
- Season: 2024–25
- Dates: Regular season: 28 September 2024 – 6 April 2025; Play Offs and play outs: 17 April – 16 May 2025
- Teams: 12

Regular season
- Season MVP: (Nigeria) Murjanatu Musa
- Relegated: Chartres Basket

Finals
- Champions: Basket Landes (2nd title)
- Runners-up: Tarbes GB
- Finals MVP: (Germany) Luisa Geiselsöder

Statistical leaders
Points	(France) Carla Leite	16.2
Rebounds	(France) Dominique Malonga	10.3
Assists	(France) Coline Franchelin	6.6
Steals	(Cameroon) Monique Akoa Makani	3.1
Blocks	(France) Dominique Malonga	1.3

The 2024–25 Ligue Féminine de Basketball (or the 2024–25 La Boulangère Wonderligue for sponsorship reasons) was the 97th season of the top division women's basketball league in France, and the 26th edition since the creation of the LFB. It started in September 2024 with the first round of the regular season and ended in May 2025.

Villeneuve d'Ascq were the defending champions.

Basket Landes won their second title after beating Tarbes GB in the final.

== Format ==
Each team played every other twice. The top eight teams qualified for the play offs, where the quarterfinals and semifinals were held as a two legged aggregate tie, while the final was played as a best of three series. The teams who did not reach the play offs instead were sent to the play outs. The play outs determined one team to be relegated.

== Regular season ==
Pos	Team	Pld	W	L	PF	PA	PD	Pts	Qualification
1	Tango Bourges Basket	22	19	3	1750	1476	+274	41	Play Offs
2	Basket Landes	22	15	7	1580	1453	+127	37 (Note: Basket Landes 1–1, +24 PD; Charnay Basket 1–1, –7 PD; Lattes Montpellier 1–1, –17 PD)	Play Offs
3	Charnay Basket	22	15	7	1623	1497	+126	37	Play Offs
4	Lattes Montpellier	22	15	7	1581	1436	+145	37	Play Offs
5	Flammes Carolo Basket	22	13	9	1625	1672	−47	35	Play Offs
6	Angers 49	22	12	10	1567	1542	+25	34	Play Offs
7	ASVEL Féminin	22	11	11	1613	1606	+7	33	Play Offs
8	Tarbes GB	22	9	13	1468	1497	−29	31	Play Offs
9	Villeneuve d'Ascq	22	7	15	1515	1565	−50	29 (Note: Villeneuve d'Ascq 160–159 Landerneau Bretagne Basket)	Play Outs
10	Landerneau Bretagne Basket	22	7	15	1441	1621	−180	29	Play Outs
11	Roche Vendee	22	6	16	1457	1681	−224	28	Play Outs
12	Chartres Basket	22	3	19	1508	1682	−174	25	Play Outs

Source: FFBB
Rules for classification: 1) Points; 2) Points difference; 3) Points scored.

== Play offs ==
Quarterfinals
1	Tango Bourges Basket	76	79	155
8	Tarbes GB	74	82	156
4	Lattes Montpellier	72	80	152
5	Flammes Carolo Basket	90	68	158
2	Basket Landes	69	69	138
7	ASVEL Féminin	68	61	129
3	Charnay Basket	57	62	119
6	Angers 49	68	50	118

Semifinals
8	Tarbes GB	56	73	129
5	Flammes Carolo Basket	60	45	105
2	Basket Landes	63	56	119
3	Charnay Basket	67	50	117

Final
8	Tarbes GB	56	44	51	1
2	Basket Landes	51	51	84	2

Champions of France

Basket Landes
Second title

== Play outs ==
Pos	Team	Pld	W	L	PF	PA	PD	Pts	Qualification
9	Villeneuve d'Ascq	12	10	2	913	788	+125	22	
10	Roche Vendee	12	5	7	815	834	−19	17 (Note: Roche Vendee 137–140 Landerneau Bretagne Basket)	
11	Landerneau Bretagne Basket	12	5	7	824	864	−40	17	
12	Chartres Basket	12	4	8	805	871	−66	16	Relegation

Source: Report
Rules for classification: 1) Points; 2) Points difference; 3) Points scored.
