= 2024–25 Czech Women's Basketball League =

Women's basketball league in the Czech Republic

Czech Women's Basketball League
- Season: 2024–25
- Dates: Regular season: 27 September 2024 – 16 February 2025; Winners and losers stage: 21 February – 16 March 2025; Play Offs: 19 March – 25 April 2025
- Teams: 10

Regular season
- Season MVP: (United States) Brionna Jones

Finals
- Champions: ZVVZ USK Praha (18th title)
- Runners-up: Žabiny Brno
- Finals MVP: (Australia) Ezi Magbegor

Statistical leaders
Points	(United States) Brionna Jones	17.8
Rebounds	(United States) Elissa Cunane	8.8
Assists	(France) Valériane Ayayi	5.2
Steals	(Czech Republic) Karolína Šotolová	2.4
Blocks	(Australia) Ezi Magbegor	1.6

The 2024–25 Czech Women's Basketball League is the 31st season of the top division women's basketball league in the Czech Republic since its establishment in 1994. It starts in September 2024 with the first round of the regular season and ends in April 2025.

ZVVZ USK Praha are the defending champions.

ZVVZ USK Praha won their eighteenth title after beating Žabiny Brno in the final.

== Format ==
In the first round, each team plays each other twice. The top five progress to the winners stage while the bottom five advance to the losers stage. In the winners stage, teams play each other once and every team reaches the play offs. In the losers stage, teams play each other once and the teams who finish in sixth, seventh and eighth place advance to the play offs. Every round in the playoffs is played as a best of five series.

== Regular season ==
Pos	Team	Pld	W	L	PF	PA	PD	Pts	Qualification
1	ZVVZ USK Praha	18	18	0	1764	827	+937	36	Winners stage
2	Žabiny Brno	18	16	2	1501	923	+578	34	Winners stage
3	SBŠ Ostrava	18	11	7	1267	1250	+17	29 (Note: SBŠ Ostrava 132–129 KP TANY Brno)	Winners stage
4	KP TANY Brno	18	11	7	1323	1284	+39	29	Winners stage
5	Levharti Chomutov	18	10	8	1327	1292	+35	28	Winners stage
6	Sokol Hradec Králové	18	10	8	1276	1320	−44	28	Losers stage
7	DSK Brandýs nad Labem	18	6	12	1264	1384	−120	24	Losers stage
8	KARA Trutnov	18	5	13	1247	1417	−170	23	Losers stage
9	Slovanka MB	18	3	15	1031	1628	−597	21	Losers stage
10	LOH 2028 Chomutov	18	0	18	904	1579	−675	18	Losers stage

Source: Ženská basketbalová liga
Rules for classification: 1) Points; 2) Points difference; 3) Points scored.

=== Winners stage ===
Pos	Team	Pld	W	L	PF	PA	PD	Pts	Qualification
1	ZVVZ USK Praha	22	22	0	2119	1060	+1059	44	Play Offs
2	Žabiny Brno	22	18	4	1769	1203	+566	40	Play Offs
3	KP TANY Brno	22	13	9	1622	1593	+29	35	Play Offs
4	SBŠ Ostrava	22	12	10	1520	1574	−54	34	Play Offs
5	Levharti Chomutov	22	11	11	1581	1577	+4	33	Play Offs

Source: Ženská basketbalová liga
Rules for classification: 1) Points; 2) Points difference; 3) Points scored.

=== Losers stage ===
Pos	Team	Pld	W	L	PF	PA	PD	Pts	Qualification
6	Sokol Hradec Králové	22	13	9	1571	1582	−11	35	Play Offs
7	DSK Brandýs nad Labem	22	10	12	1606	1683	−77	32	Play Offs
8	KARA Trutnov	22	7	15	1566	1687	−121	29	Play Offs
9	Slovanka MB	22	4	18	1288	1918	−630	26	
10	LOH 2028 Chomutov	22	0	22	1148	1913	−765	22	

Source: Ženská basketbalová liga
Rules for classification: 1) Points; 2) Points difference; 3) Points scored.

== Play offs ==
Quarterfinals
1	ZVVZ USK Praha	97	106	108	3
8	KARA Trutnov	50	65	55	0
4	SBŠ Ostrava	47	58	58	61	1
5	Levharti Chomutov	52	56	70	78	3
2	Žabiny Brno	92	93	86	3
7	DSK Brandýs nad Labem	55	57	26	0
3	KP TANY Brno	83	76	69	3
6	Sokol Hradec Králové	60	64	55	0

Semifinals
1	ZVVZ USK Praha	86	82	90	3
5	Levharti Chomutov	58	44	44	0
2	Žabiny Brno	84	85	90	3
3	KP TANY Brno	62	77	53	0

Final
1	ZVVZ USK Praha	68	82	83	3
2	Žabiny Brno	50	75	52	0
Third place
3	KP TANY Brno	82	80	81	3
5	Levharti Chomutov	64	46	66	0

Champions of the Czech Republic

ZVVZ USK Praha
Eighteenth title
