= 2024–25 Nemzeti Bajnokság I/A (women's basketball) =

Women's basketball league in Hungary

Nemzeti Bajnokság I/A
- Season: 2024–25
- Dates: Regular season: 27 September 2024 – 16 March 2025; Play Offs and play outs: 26 March – 27 April 2025

Regular season
- Season MVP: (Hungary) Virag Kiss

Finals
- Champions: Sopron Basket (16th title)
- Runners-up: DVTK HUN-Therm
- Finals MVP: (Australia) Stephanie Reid

Statistical leaders
Points	(United States) Mar'Shay Moore	19.3
Rebounds	(Hungary) Judit Barnai	11.4
Assists	(Hungary) Panka Dul	6.1
Steals	(United States) Hannah Little	3.1
Blocks	(Hungary) Judit Barnai	2.1

The 2024–25 Nemzeti Bajnokság I/A is the 88th season of the top division women's basketball league in Hungary since its establishment in 1933. It starts in September 2024 with the first round of the regular season and ends in April 2025.

DVTK HUN-Therm are the defending champions.

Sopron Basket won their Sixteenth title after beating DVTK HUN-Therm in the final.

== Format ==
Each team plays each other twice. The top eight teams qualify for the play offs. The quarterfinals and semifinals are played as a best of three series while the final is played as a best of five series. The teams who don't reach the play offs advance to the play outs where one team will be relegated.

== Regular season ==
Pos	Team	Pld	W	L	PF	PA	PD	Pts	Qualification
1	Sopron Basket	22	19	3	1860	1279	+581	41	Play Offs
2	DVTK HUN-Therm	22	18	4	1789	1208	+581	40 (Note: DVTK HUN-Therm 1–1, +44 PD; NKA Universitas PEAC 1–1, –13 PD; SERCO Uni Győr 1–1, –31 PD)	Play Offs
3	NKA Universitas PEAC	22	18	4	1849	1413	+436	40	Play Offs
4	SERCO Uni Győr	22	18	4	1953	1422	+531	40	Play Offs
5	TARR KSC Szekszárd	22	14	8	1795	1600	+195	36 (Note: TARR KSC Szekszárd 141–131 TFSE-MTK Budapest)	Play Offs
6	TFSE-MTK Budapest	22	14	8	1591	1414	+177	36	Play Offs
7	Vasas Academy	22	10	12	1432	1566	−134	32	Play Offs
8	VBW CEKK Cegléd	22	7	15	1301	1737	−436	29	Play Offs
9	Dávid Kornél KA	22	6	16	1517	1854	−337	28	Play Outs
10	E.ON ELTE BEAC	22	5	17	1425	1715	−290	27	Play Outs
11	BKG-PRIMA Szigetszentmiklós	22	3	19	1346	1888	−542	25	Play Outs
12	Darazsak Sportakadémia	22	0	22	1197	1959	−762	22	Play Outs

Source: Hungarian Women's Basketball Championship
Rules for classification: 1) Points; 2) Points difference; 3) Points scored.

== Play offs ==
Quarterfinals
1	Sopron Basket	76	92	2
8	VBW CEKK Cegléd	42	63	0
4	SERCO Uni Győr	97	74	80	2
5	TARR KSC Szekszárd	73	77	62	1
2	DVTK HUN-Therm	88	63	2
7	Vasas Academy	62	58	0
3	NKA Universitas PEAC	83	77	2
6	TFSE-MTK Budapest	69	72	0

Semifinals
1	Sopron Basket	93	78	68	2
4	SERCO Uni Győr	73	85	55	1
2	DVTK HUN-Therm	87	84	2
3	NKA Universitas PEAC	55	61	0

Final
1	Sopron Basket	82	47	64	66	54	3
2	DVTK HUN-Therm	74	78	73	64	48	2
Third place
3	NKA Universitas PEAC	86	92	2
4	SERCO Uni Győr	73	83	0

=== 5–8 classification bracket ===
Semifinals
5	TARR KSC Szekszárd	91	87	2
8	VBW CEKK Cegléd	52	63	0
6	TFSE-MTK Budapest	87	69	2
7	Vasas Academy	59	51	0

Fifth place
5	TARR KSC Szekszárd	58	77	0
6	TFSE-MTK Budapest	83	91	2
Seventh place
7	Vasas Academy	74	60	2
8	VBW CEKK Cegléd	60	57	0

== Play outs ==
Pos	Team	Pld	W	L	PF	PA	PD	Pts	Qualification
9	Dávid Kornél KA	28	10	18	1983	2287	−304	38	
10	E.ON ELTE BEAC	28	9	19	1875	2104	−229	37	
11	BKG-PRIMA Szigetszentmiklós	28	7	21	1772	2305	−533	35	
12	Darazsak Sportakadémia	28	0	28	1559	2424	−865	28	Relegation

Source: Hungarian Women's Basketball Championship
Rules for classification: 1) Points; 2) Points difference; 3) Points scored.

Champions of Hungary

Sopron Basket
Sixteenth title
