= 2024–25 Slovak Women's Basketball Extraliga =

Women's basketball league in Slovakia

Slovak Women's Basketball Extraliga
- Season: 2024–25
- Dates: Regular season: 25 September 2024 – 25 January 2025; Winners and losers stage: 12 February – 22 March 2025; Play Offs: 29 March – 26 April 2025
- Teams: 10

Regular season
- Season MVP: (Ukraine) Olha Yatskovets

Finals
- Champions: Piešťanské Čajky (4th title)
- Runners-up: Slávia Banská Bystrica
- Finals MVP: (United States) Ke'Shunan James

Statistical leaders
Points	(Ukraine) Olha Yatskovets	20.3
Rebounds	(Canada) Nicole Fransson	11.8
Assists	(Italy) Elisa Pinzan	6.2
Steals	(Italy) Elisa Pinzan	3.5
Blocks	(United States) Rita Igbokwe	1.4

The 2024–25 Slovak Women's Basketball Extraliga is the 33rd season of the top division women's basketball league in Slovakia since its establishment in 1993. It starts in September 2024 with the first round of the regular season and ends in April 2025.

Piešťanské Čajky are the defending champions.

Piešťanské Čajky won their fourth title after beating Slávia Banská Bystrica in the final.

== Format ==
In the first round, each team plays each other twice. The top six progress to the winners stage while the bottom four advance to the losers stage. In the winners stage, teams play each other twice and the top four reach the play offs. The fifth and sixth place teams play the 5–8 classification round. In the losers stage, teams play each other twice and the teams who finish in seventh and eighth place advance to the 5–8 classification round while the ninth and tenth teams play a relegation play off. Every round in the playoffs is played as a best of five series.

== Regular season ==
Pos	Team	Pld	W	L	PF	PA	PD	Pts	Qualification
1	Piešťanské Čajky	18	18	0	1774	779	+995	36	Winners stage
2	MBK Ružomberok	18	16	2	1748	829	+919	34	Winners stage
3	Slávia Banská Bystrica	18	14	4	1619	1054	+565	32	Winners stage
4	Young Angels Košice	18	12	6	1447	1186	+261	30	Winners stage
5	Slovan Bratislava	18	9	9	1228	1165	+63	27	Winners stage
6	CBK Košice	18	8	10	1175	1512	−337	26	Winners stage
7	UMB Banská Bystrica	18	6	12	1178	1417	−239	24	Losers stage
8	Klokani Ivanka pri Dunaji	18	4	14	917	1654	−737	22	Losers stage
9	ŠBK Šamorín	18	2	16	947	1464	−517	20	Losers stage
10	AS Trenčín	18	1	17	821	1794	−973	19	Losers stage

Source: Women's Extraliga
Rules for classification: 1) Points; 2) Points difference; 3) Points scored.

=== Winners stage ===
Pos	Team	Pld	W	L	PF	PA	PD	Pts	Qualification
1	Piešťanské Čajky	28	26	2	2530	1370	+1160	54	Play Offs
2	MBK Ružomberok	28	25	3	2507	1309	+1198	53	Play Offs
3	Slávia Banská Bystrica	28	20	8	2355	1708	+647	48	Play Offs
4	Young Angels Košice	28	17	11	2187	1966	+221	45	Play Offs
5	Slovan Bratislava	28	11	17	1834	1898	−64	39	5–8 classification round
6	CBK Košice	28	8	20	1745	2441	−696	36	5–8 classification round

Source: Women's Extraliga
Rules for classification: 1) Points; 2) Points difference; 3) Points scored.

=== Losers stage ===
Pos	Team	Pld	W	L	PF	PA	PD	Pts	Qualification
7	UMB Banská Bystrica	24	11	13	1651	1732	−81	35	5–8 classification bracket
8	Klokani Ivanka pri Dunaji	24	7	17	1336	2073	−737	31	5–8 classification bracket
9	ŠBK Šamorín	24	6	18	1373	1879	−506	30	Relegation Play Off
10	AS Trenčín (R)	24	1	23	1135	2277	−1142	25	Relegation Play Off

Source: Women's Extraliga
Rules for classification: 1) Points; 2) Points difference; 3) Points scored.
(R) Relegated

== Play offs ==
Semifinals
1	Piešťanské Čajky	80	89	88	3
4	Young Angels Košice	65	65	61	0
2	MBK Ružomberok	64	57	64	60	1
3	Slávia Banská Bystrica	55	63	72	61	3

Final
1	Piešťanské Čajky	75	75	82	3
3	Slávia Banská Bystrica	50	68	71	0
Third place
2	MBK Ružomberok	92	76	82	2
4	Young Angels Košice	49	79	72	1

=== 5–8 classification bracket ===
Semifinals
5	Slovan Bratislava	103	81	2
8	Klokani Ivanka pri Dunaji	57	46	0
6	CBK Košice	72	57	54	1
7	UMB Banská Bystrica	54	66	68	2

Fifth place
5	Slovan Bratislava	74	60	69	2
7	UMB Banská Bystrica	68	73	47	1
Seventh place
6	CBK Košice	74	75	2
8	Klokani Ivanka pri Dunaji	47	68	0

Champions of Slovakia

Piešťanské Čajky
Fourth title

== Relegation play offs ==
The loser of the first round plays BAM Poprad in the relegation play off.

Semifinals					Final
					10	AS Trenčín	67	77	144
						BAM Poprad	67	38	105
9	ŠBK Šamorín	77	82	159		BAM Poprad	67	38	105
10	AS Trenčín	52	64	116
