= 2024–25 Belgian Women's Basketball League =

Women's basketball league in Belgium

Belgian Women's Basketball League
- Season: 2024–25
- Dates: Regular season: 21 September 2024 – 29 March 2025; Play Offs: 3–22 April 2025
- Games played: 147
- Teams: 12

Regular season
- Season MVP: (United States) Cate Reese

Finals
- Champions: Castors Braine (7th title)
- Runners-up: Kangoeroes Basket Mechelen
- Finals MVP: (United States) Quay Miller

Statistical leaders
Points	(United States) Cate Reese	22.2
Rebounds	(Cameroon) Aliyah Kenny	14.2
Assists	(Lithuania) Santa Okockyte	4.1
Steals	(Belgium) Ine Vanderhoydonks	3.6
Blocks	(Romania) Anamaria Virjoghe	1.8

The 2024–25 Belgian Women's Basketball League is the 90th season of the top division women's basketball league in Belgium since its establishment in 1934. It starts in September 2024 with the first round of the regular season and ends in April 2025.

Kangoeroes Basket Mechelen are the defending champions.

Castors Braine won their seventh title after beating Kangoeroes Basket Mechelen in the final.

== Format ==
Each team plays each other twice. The top eight teams qualify for the play offs, where every round is held as a best of three series. The teams who don't reach the play offs advance to the play outs where one team will be relegated.

== Regular season ==
Pos	Team	Pld	W	L	PF	PA	PD	Pts	Qualification
1	Castors Braine	22	21	1	1997	1222	+775	43	Play Offs
2	Kangoeroes Basket Mechelen	22	21	1	1969	1233	+736	43	Play Offs
3	Basket Namur Capitale	22	17	5	1711	1376	+335	39	Play Offs
4	ION Basket Waregem	22	14	8	1718	1536	+182	36	Play Offs
5	Phantoms Basket Boom	22	12	10	1815	1532	+283	34	Play Offs
6	Kortrijk Spurs	22	12	10	1605	1529	+76	34	Play Offs
7	Spirou Ladies Charleroi	22	10	12	1584	1705	−121	32	Play Offs
8	LDP Donza	22	9	13	1532	1616	−84	31	Play Offs
9	Amon Jeugd Gentson	22	8	14	1326	1681	−355	30	Play Outs
10	Liege Panthers	22	5	17	1342	1593	−251	27	Play Outs
11	Basket Lummen	22	2	20	1241	1875	−634	24	Play Outs
12	Basketball Brunehaut	22	1	21	1144	2086	−942	23	Play Outs

Source: Belgian Women's Basketball League
Rules for classification: 1) Points; 2) Points difference; 3) Points scored.

== Play offs ==
Quarterfinals
1	Castors Braine	110	90	2
8	LDP Donza	62	64	0
4	ION Basket Waregem	63	93	0
5	Phantoms Basket Boom	74	100	2
2	Kangoeroes Basket Mechelen	99	88	2
7	Spirou Ladies Charleroi	73	53	0
3	Basket Namur Capitale	79	99	2
6	Kortrijk Spurs	73	42	0

Semifinals
1	Castors Braine	96	85	2
5	Phantoms Basket Boom	61	73	0
2	Kangoeroes Basket Mechelen	82	77	2
3	Basket Namur Capitale	67	69	0

Final
1	Castors Braine	69	82	81	2
2	Kangoeroes Basket Mechelen	77	77	69	1

Champions of Belgium

Castors Braine
Seventh title

== Play outs ==
The winners of the play offs stay up.

Semi-finals
9	Amon Jeugd Gentson	20
12	Basketball Brunehaut	0
10	Liege Panthers	72
11	Basket Lummen	54

Final
9	Amon Jeugd Gentson	69
10	Liege Panthers	75
