= 2024–25 Damen-Basketball-Bundesliga =

Women's basketball league in Bosnia and Herzegovina

Damen-Basketball-Bundesliga
- Season: 2024–25
- Dates: Regular season: 28 September 2024 – 15 March 2025; Play Offs: 19 March – 25 April 2025
- Teams: 12

Regular season
- Season MVP: (United States) Martha Burse
- Relegated: Wings Leverkusen

Finals
- Champions: Rutronik Stars Keltern (4th title)
- Runners-up: Saarlouis Royals
- Finals MVP: (Germany) Alexandra Wilke

Statistical leaders
Points	(Canada) Nicole Fransson	21.5
Rebounds	(Canada) Nicole Fransson	11.5
Assists	(France) Claire Parisi	6.0
Steals	(United States) Kylie Kornegay-Lucas	3.3
Blocks	(Canada) Alexandria Kiss-Rusk	1.2

The 2024–25 Damen-Basketball-Bundesliga is the 54th season of the top division women's basketball league in Germany since its establishment in 1970. It starts in September 2024 with the first round of the regular season and ends in April 2025.

ALBA Berlin are the defending champions.

Rutronik Stars Keltern won their fourth title after beating Saarlouis Royals in the final.

== Format ==
Each team plays each other twice. The top eight teams qualify for the play offs where every round is held as a best of five series.

This season will feature no relegation based on merit.

== Regular season ==
Pos	Team	Pld	W	L	PF	PA	PD	Pts	Qualification
1	Rutronik Stars Keltern	22	20	2	1756	1288	+468	42	Play Offs
2	ALBA Berlin	22	18	4	1520	1315	+205	40	Play Offs
3	Saarlouis Royals	22	16	6	1685	1521	+164	38	Play Offs
4	GiroLive Panthers Osnabrück	22	14	8	1611	1528	+83	36	Play Offs
5	TK Hannover Luchse	22	13	9	1554	1599	−45	35	Play Offs
6	Herner TC	22	11	11	1537	1496	+41	33 (Note: Herner TC 145–143 Syntainics MBC)	Play Offs
7	Syntainics MBC	22	11	11	1537	1549	−12	33	Play Offs
8	Owner: Angels Nördlingen	22	9	13	1499	1669	−170	31	Play Offs
9	BC Pharmaserv Marburg	22	7	15	1576	1662	−86	29	
10	Wings Leverkusen (Note: Wings Leverkusen decided to play in the 2. Damen-Basketball-Bundesliga next season due to financial issues.)	22	6	16	1509	1698	−189	28	Relegation
11	Medical Instinct Violet BG 74 (Note: Medical Instinct Violet BG 74 were relegated after failing to receive a licence for next season.)	22	4	18	1422	1642	−220	26	Relegation
12	Kingfishers USC Freiburg	22	3	19	1475	1714	−239	25	

Source: 1. Damen-Basketball-Bundesliga
Rules for classification: 1) Points; 2) Points difference; 3) Points scored.

== Play offs ==
Quarterfinals
1	Rutronik Stars Keltern	70	85	80	3
8	Owner: Angels Nördlingen	54	53	71	0
4	GiroLive Panthers Osnabrück	76	94	70	85	3
5	TK Hannover Luchse	80	65	67	71	1
2	ALBA Berlin	83	71	68	3
7	Syntainics MBC	59	56	66	0
3	Saarlouis Royals	86	73	77	3
6	Herner TC	80	64	56	0

Semifinals
1	Rutronik Stars Keltern	73	68	75	61	77	3
4	GiroLive Panthers Osnabrück	67	70	70	73	53	2
2	ALBA Berlin	66	67	52	55	67	2
3	Saarlouis Royals	57	70	66	52	75	3

Final
1	Rutronik Stars Keltern	92	93	76	3
3	Saarlouis Royals	54	57	62	0

Champions of Germany

Rutronik Stars Keltern
Fourth title
