= 2024–25 LSBL Championships =

Women's basketball league in Latvia

LSBL Championships
- Season: 2024–25
- Dates: Regular season: 26 October 2024 – 1 March 2025; Play Offs: 12 March – 11 April 2025
- Games played: 20
- Teams: 5

Regular season
- Season MVP: (United States) Mia Loyd

Finals
- Champions: TTT Riga (24th title)
- Runners-up: SBK Liepāja/LSSS
- Finals MVP: (United States) Mia Loyd

Statistical leaders
Points	(United States) Mia Loyd	17.1
Rebounds	(United States) Mia Loyd	8.3
Assists	(Latvia) Ketija Vihmane	5.0
Steals	(Ukraine) Polina Tupalo	3.0
Blocks	(Latvia) Annija Birzina	2.0

The 2024–25 LSBL Championships is the 33rd season of the top division women's basketball league in Latvia since its establishment in 1992. It starts in October 2024 with the first round of the regular season and ends in April 2025.

TTT Riga are the defending champions.

TTT Riga won their 24th title after beating SBK Liepāja/LSSS in the final.

== Format ==
Each team played one another twice, where the top three teams reached the play offs while the fourth place team would be pitted against Daugavpils University in a home and away tie to decide the fourth seed. In the play offs, each round was played as a home and away aggregate tie.

== Regular season ==
Pos	Team	Pld	W	L	PF	PA	PD	Pts	Qualification
1	TTT Riga	6	6	0	528	362	+166	12	Play Offs
2	SBK Liepāja/LSSS	6	3	3	365	369	−4	9 (Note: SBK Liepāja/LSSS 115–114 RSU Riga)	Play Offs
3	RSU Riga	6	3	3	368	392	−24	9	Play Offs
4	TTT Riga Juniors	6	0	6	306	444	−138	6	Play in

Source: LSBL
Rules for classification: 1) Points; 2) Points difference; 3) Points scored.

== Play offs ==
Quarterfinals
4	TTT Riga Juniors	65	88	153
5	Daugavpils University	73	67	140

Semifinals
1	TTT Riga	98	116	214
4	TTT Riga Juniors	48	41	89
2	SBK Liepāja/LSSS	75	50	125
3	RSU Riga	57	49	106

Final
1	TTT Riga	84	75	159
2	SBK Liepāja/LSSS	69	55	124

Champions of Latvia

TTT Riga
24th title
