= Sydney Taylor (basketball) =

American basketball player (born 2001)

No. 12 – Chicago Sky
- Position: Guard
- League: WNBA

Personal information
- Born: June 21, 2001 (age 25)
- Listed height: 5 ft 9 in (1.75 m)

Career information
- High school: St. Anthony's (South Huntington, New York)
- College: UMass (2019–2023); Louisville (2023–2024)
- Playing career: 2024–present

Career history
- 2024–2025: Kibirkstis Vilnius
- 2025–2026: MB Zagłębie Sosnowiec
- 2026–present: Chicago Sky
- 2027–present: Lunar Owls BC

Career highlights
- WNBA All-Rookie Team (2026); FIBA 3x3 AmeriCup Team of the Tournament (2026); First-team All-Atlantic 10 (2023); Second-team All-Atlantic 10 (2022)
- Stats at WNBA.com
- Stats at Basketball Reference

Sydney Leah Taylor (born June 21, 2001) is an American professional basketball player for the Chicago Sky of the Women's National Basketball Association (WNBA) and for the Lunar Olws of Unrivaled. She played college basketball at UMass and Louisville.

== Early life ==
Taylor attended St. Anthony's High School where she helped lead the Friars to CHSAA championships each of her first three seasons and a state title as a freshman.

== College career ==
Taylor began her college basketball at UMass. During the 2019–20 season, in her freshman year, she played in 17 games as a reserve and averaged 6.1 minutes per game. During the 2020–21 season, in her sophomore year, she started all 24 games, and averaged 15.6 points per game.

During the 2021–22 season, in her junior year, she started all 33 games, and averaged 15.9 points per game and had 26 double figure games. On January 12, 2022, against VCU, she scored a then career-high 32 points, including a career-high 12 field goals made. Following the season she was named to the Atlantic 10 All-Second team.

During the 2022–23 season, in her senior year, she started all 33 games, and averaged 16.1 points per game. On January 22, 2023, against Dayton, she scored 30 points, including a career-best seven three-point field goals made. On February 4, 2023, against La Salle, she recorded 26 points and a career-high 10 rebounds, for her first career double-double. She led the Atlantic 10 in three-point field goals made and tied for seventh in the nation with 104 three-pointers. Following the season she was named to the Atlantic 10 All-First team.

On April 22, 2023, she transferred to Louisville for her final year of eligibility. During the 2023–24 season, in her graduate year, she appeared in 34 games, with 32 starts, and averaged 10.8 points, 2.8 rebounds and 2.2 assists per game. She finished the season with a team-best 57 made three-pointers.

== Professional career ==
=== Europe ===
Following her collegiate career, Taylor played overseas in Lithuania and Poland. During the 2025–26 season, she played for MB Zagłębie Sosnowiec of the Basket Liga Kobiet, and averaged 22.8 points, 3.7 rebounds, 3.8 assists and 1.4 steals per game.

On July 25, 2026, she signed a contract with the Turkish giant Galatasaray. On September 30, 2026, Galatasaray vice-president Mehmet Cibara announced that Taylor had decided against coming to Turkey.

=== WNBA ===
On April 13, 2026, she signed a training camp contract with the Chicago Sky of the WNBA. On April 29, 2026, during the final pre-season game of the season against the Atlanta Dream, she scored a team-high 23 points. She made the Sky's opening day roster. On May 27, 2026, against the Toronto Tempo, she scored a team-high 27 points in 23 minutes off the bench. On June 11, 2026, against the Indiana Fever, she scored a career-high 30 points in 20 minutes and 41 seconds off the bench. She became the second player in WNBA history to score at least 30 points in 21 or fewer minutes. She also became just the fourth rookie in league history to record multiple games of at least 25 points off the bench in the same season. She moved to the starting lineup on June 17, 2026. She scored 24 points in 28 minutes during her first career start, including a three-pointer that put the Sky ahead by one with 15 seconds remaining. The Sky ultimately lost to the New York Liberty 96–95 after Taylor missed a contested jumper at the buzzer.
