= 2024–25 Croatian First Women's Basketball League =

Women's basketball league in Croatia

Croatian First Women's Basketball League
- Season: 2024–25
- Dates: Regular season: 28 September 2024 – 6 April 2025; Play Offs: 24 April – 13 May 2025

Regular season
- Season MVP: (Croatia) Iva Todoric

Finals
- Champions: Ragusa (5th title)
- Runners-up: Trešnjevka 2009
- Finals MVP: (Croatia) Nevena Vuckovic

Statistical leaders
Points	(United States) Asiah Dingle	23.1
Rebounds	(Croatia) Emilija Podrug	14.0
Assists	(Croatia) Iva Todoric	6.8
Steals	(United States) Asiah Dingle	5.0
Blocks	two players	1.6

The 2024–25 Croatian First Women's Basketball League is the 34th season of the top division women's basketball league in Croatia since its establishment in 1991. It starts in September 2024 with the first round of the regular season and ends in May 2025.

Ragusa are the defending champions.

Ragusa won their fifth title after beating Trešnjevka 2009 in the final.

== Format ==
Each team plays each other twice. The top four teams qualify for the play offs. The semifinals are played as a best of three series while the final is played as a best of five series.

== Regular season ==
Pos	Team	Pld	W	L	PF	PA	PD	Pts	Qualification
1	Ragusa	22	21	1	1824	1315	+509	43 (Note: Ragusa 118–112 Trešnjevka 2009)	Play Offs
2	Trešnjevka 2009	22	21	1	1661	1284	+377	43	Play Offs
3	Novi Zagreb	22	15	7	1762	1544	+218	37 (Note: Novi Zagreb 174–168 Šibenik)	Play Offs
4	Šibenik	22	15	7	1734	1627	+107	37	Play Offs
5	Zadar Plus	22	14	8	1696	1717	−21	36	
6	Plamen Požega	22	12	10	1634	1541	+93	34	
7	FSV	22	9	13	1472	1541	−69	31	
8	Zadar	22	7	15	1569	1677	−108	29	
9	Brod na Savi	22	6	16	1494	1725	−231	28 (Note: Brod na Savi 146–126 Akademija Žana Lelas)	
10	Akademija Žana Lelas	22	6	16	1459	1537	−78	28	
11	Medveščak	22	4	18	1378	1560	−182	26	
12	Pula	22	2	20	1440	2055	−615	24	Relegation

Source: Premijer liga
Rules for classification: 1) Points; 2) Points difference; 3) Points scored.

== Play offs ==
Semifinals	Final
1	Ragusa	90	76	2
4	Šibenik	68	69	0
1	Ragusa	68	46	76	3
2	Trešnjevka 2009	61	45	75	0
2	Trešnjevka 2009	56	73	80	2
3	Novi Zagreb	67	41	62	1

Champions of Croatia

Ragusa
Fifth title
