= Czech Women's Basketball League =

Czech Women's Basketball League Česká ženská basketbalová liga
- Current season, competition or edition: 2025–26 Czech Women's Basketball League
- Sport: Basketball
- Founded: 1993
- First season: 1993–94
- No. of teams: 10
- Country: Czech Republic
- Continent: FIBA Europe (Europe)
- Level on pyramid: 1
- Website: https://zbl.basketball/

The Czech Women's Basketball League (Czech: Česká ženská basketbalová liga) is a women's basketball league in the Czech Republic. The league debuted in 1993, with Prague team USK Praha winning the inaugural championship and the most overall titles with 17.

== History ==
The Czechoslovak Zenska Basketball League ran between 1945 and 1993. In 1993, the Zenska Basketbolova Liga was established.

== Current teams ==
As of the 2024–25 season:

- ZVVZ USK Praha
- Žabiny Brno
- SBŠ Ostrava
- KP Brno
- Levhartice Chomutov
- Sokol Hradec Králové
- DSK Brandýs
- BK Lokomotiva Trutnov
- Slovanka
- LOH 2028 Chomutov

== Champions ==
Season	Winner	Runner-up	Result
1993–94	USK Praha	SK MORCAN Královo Pole	.
1994–95	USK ERPET Praha	IMOS Žabovřesky	.
1995–96	IMOS Žabovřesky	USK ERPET Praha	.
1996–97	IMOS Žabovřesky	USK ERPET Praha	.
1997–98	IMOS Gambrinus Žabovřesky	BK Kaučuk Kralupy nad Vltavou	.
1998–99	IMOS Gambrinus Žabovřesky	SBC Hanácká Kyselka Přerov	.
1999–00	Gambrinus Brno	SBC Hanácká Kyselka Přerov	.
2000–01	Gambrinus BVV Brno	USK Blex K.V. Praha	.
2001–02	Gambrinus JME Brno	USK Blex K.V. Praha	.
2002–03	Gambrinus JME Brno	USK Blex K.V. Praha	.
2003–04	Gambrinus JME Brno	VČE Loko Trutnov	.
2004–05	Gambrinus JME Brno	USK Blex K.V. Praha	.
2005–06	Gambrinus SIKA Brno	USK Blex K.V. Praha	3:0
2006–07	Gambrinus SIKA Brno	USK Blex K.V. Praha	3:0
2007–08	Gambrinus SIKA Brno	USK Praha	3:0
2008–09	USK Praha	Gambrinus SIKA Brno	3:2
2009–10	Frisco SIKA Brno	USK Praha	3:1
2010–11	USK Praha	Frisco SIKA Brno	3:0
2011–12	USK Praha	Frisco SIKA Brno	3:0
2012–13	USK Praha	IMOS Brno	3:1
2013–14	USK Praha	IMOS Brno	3:0
2014–15	USK Praha	Sokol HK	3:0
2015–16	USK Praha	DSK Nymburk	3:0
2016–17	USK Praha	Sokol HK	3:0
2017–18	USK Praha	KP Brno	3:0
2018–19	USK Praha	BK Žabiny Brno	3:0
2019–20	USK Praha	Sokol HK	3:0
2020–21	USK Praha	Sokol HK	3:0
2021–22	USK Praha	BK Žabiny Brno	3:0
2022–23	USK Praha	BK Žabiny Brno	3:0
2023–24	USK Praha	BK Žabiny Brno	3:1
2024–25	USK Praha	BK Žabiny Brno	3:0
2025–26	USK Praha	BK Žabiny Brno	3:0
