= Pallas Kunaiyi-Akpannah =

Nigerian basketball player

Pallas Kunaiyi-Akpanah
- Pallas Kunaiyi 2026

Emlak Konut
- Position: Center /power forward
- League: Women's Basketball Super League

Personal information
- Born: July 12, 1997 (age 29) Port Harcourt, Rivers State, Nigeria
- Listed height: 6 ft 2 in (1.88 m)

Career information
- High school: Rabun Gap-Nacoochee School, Rabun County, Georgia
- College: Northwestern Wildcats
- WNBA draft: 2019: undrafted
- Playing career: 2019–present

Career history
- 2019–2019: Chicago Sky
- 2019–2020: Pallacanestro Vigarano
- 2020–2021: BC Namur-Capitale
- 2021–2023: Faenza Basket Project
- 2023–2025: Magnolia Campobasso
- 2025–2026: BCC Derthona
- 2026–present: Emlak Konut

Pallas Daemi Kunaiyi-Akpanah (born July 12, 1997) is a Nigerian basketball player. She played college basketball for the Northwestern Wildcats She plays for the Turkish Women's Basketball Super League side Emlak Konut.

== High school ==
Kunaiyi-Akpannah started her high school in a boarding school in Nigeria, she started playing basketball at the age of 14, she attended a basketball camp Hope for girls organised by Mobolaji Akiode in Abuja Nigeria where her athletic abilities were noticed. Kunaiyi-Akpannah moved to Rabun Gap-Nacoochee School, Rabun County, Georgia, United States, from Nigeria when she was 15 years old, she played travel basketball in her high school holidays and she also averaged a double-double behind close to 10 points and more than 11 rebounds per game while helping the Eagles to a 21–5 record. She led her team to a second-place finish in the 2014 State Tournament She also participated in other sports such as track and field events at high School.

== College career ==
Kunaiyi-Akpannah played college basketball for the Northwestern Wildcats where she was teammates with fifth overall pick in the 2017 draft Nia Coffey, she averaged less than 4 points per game and she also averaged 9.3 rebounds per game in four Big Ten Tournament games despite playing only 21.8 minutes per game in her freshman season at Northwestern Kunaiyi-Akpannah sophomore year saw her average 1.6 points and 3.8 rebounds per game. In her junior year, she was second in the Big Ten with 11.3 points and 11.9 rebounds per game, and her 18 double-doubles were eighth in the nation. In her final year, she was named in the First Team All-Big Ten by the media, after finishing third in the conference in rebounds and 13th in the nation with 11 rebounds, while increasing her scoring to 11.1 points. She made over 1000 rebounds during her time in college, she is the second player in Northwestern History to make over 1000 rebounds.

== Professional career ==
Kunaiyi-Akpannah was undrafted in the 2019 WNBA Draft, she was signed into a training camp contract by the WNBA team Chicago Sky on May 4, 2019, she was later waived by the team on May 8, 2019.

Kunaiyi-Akpannah moved to the Italian Seria A side Pallacanestro Vigarano in 2019, she plays as a Center on the team. On December 15, 2019, she had a double-double which included 11 points and a career high of 27 rebounds against Broni where the team won 83–75.

On 28 May 2020, Kunaiyi-Akpannah signed for Namur-Capitale for the 2020–2021 season. The team ended the season winning the Belgian Championship after fellow finalists, Castors Braine, withdrew due to many of their players testing positive for COVID-19.

On 29 June 2021, she signed for Italian Seria A club Faenza Basket Project for the 2021–2022 season.

== Nigerian National Women's Basketball team ==
Kunaiyi-Akpannah was called up to represent the D'Tigress and to participate in the 2019 pre Olympic Qualifying tournament in Mozambique where she made her debut in representing Nigeria, she averaged 4 rebounds during the tournament. She was also called up to participate in the 2020 FIBA Women's Olympic Qualifying Tournaments in Belgrade.

== Personal life ==
Her father, Daemi Kunaiyi-Akpannah, is a former member of the Nigerian House of Representatives for Rivers State.
