= 2024–25 Women's Superliga (basketball) =

Women's basketball league in Bosnia and Herzegovina

Women's Superliga
- Season: 2024–25
- Dates: Regular season: 11 October 2024 – 29 March 2025; Play Offs: 1–15 April 2025
- Games played: 67
- Teams: 6

Regular season
- Season MVP: (United States) Jeanae Terry

Finals
- Champions: Bashkimi (9th title)
- Runners-up: Peja 03
- Finals MVP: (United States) Adrienne Williams

Statistical leaders
Points	(United States) Vivian Woo	22.2
Rebounds	(United States) Jeanae Terry	13.8
Assists	(Kosovo) Arbnore Perquku	8.6
Steals	(United States) Abby Ogle	4.9
Blocks	(United States) Jayla Johnson	1.5

The 2024–25 Women's Superliga is the 17th season of the top division women's basketball league in Kosovo since its establishment in 2008. It starts in October 2024 with the first round of the regular season and ends in April 2025.

Bashkimi are the defending champions.

Bashkimi won their ninth title after beating Peja 03 in the final.

== Format ==
Each team plays each other four times. The top four teams qualify for the play offs. The semifinals are played as a best of three series while the final is played as a best of five series.

== Regular season ==
Pos	Team	Pld	W	L	PF	PA	PD	Pts	Qualification
1	Bashkimi	20	19	1	1609	1241	+368	39	Play Offs
2	Peja 03	20	13	7	1548	1233	+315	33	Play Offs
3	Prishtina	20	12	8	1442	1351	+91	32	Play Offs
4	Penza	20	9	11	1491	1574	−83	29	Play Offs
5	Junior 06 Moni Bau	20	5	15	1307	1637	−330	25	
6	Trepça	20	2	18	1210	1571	−361	22	

Source: Superliga Femrat
Rules for classification: 1) Points; 2) Points difference; 3) Points scored.

== Play offs ==
Semifinals	Final
1	Bashkimi	127	104	2
4	Penza	55	53	0
1	Bashkimi	82	86	69	3
2	Peja 03	79	82	58	0
2	Peja 03	87	84	2
3	Prishtina	76	65	0

Champions of Kosovo

Bashkimi
Ninth title
