= Basket 25 Bydgoszcz =

- League: Basket Liga Kobiet
- Founded: 1994
- Arena: Grupa Moderator Arena (capacity: 1,470)
- Location: Bydgoszcz, Poland
- Team colors: Black and Pink
- President: (Poland) Piotr Kulpeksza
- Head coach: (Poland) Maciej Gordon
- Website: ksbasket25.pl

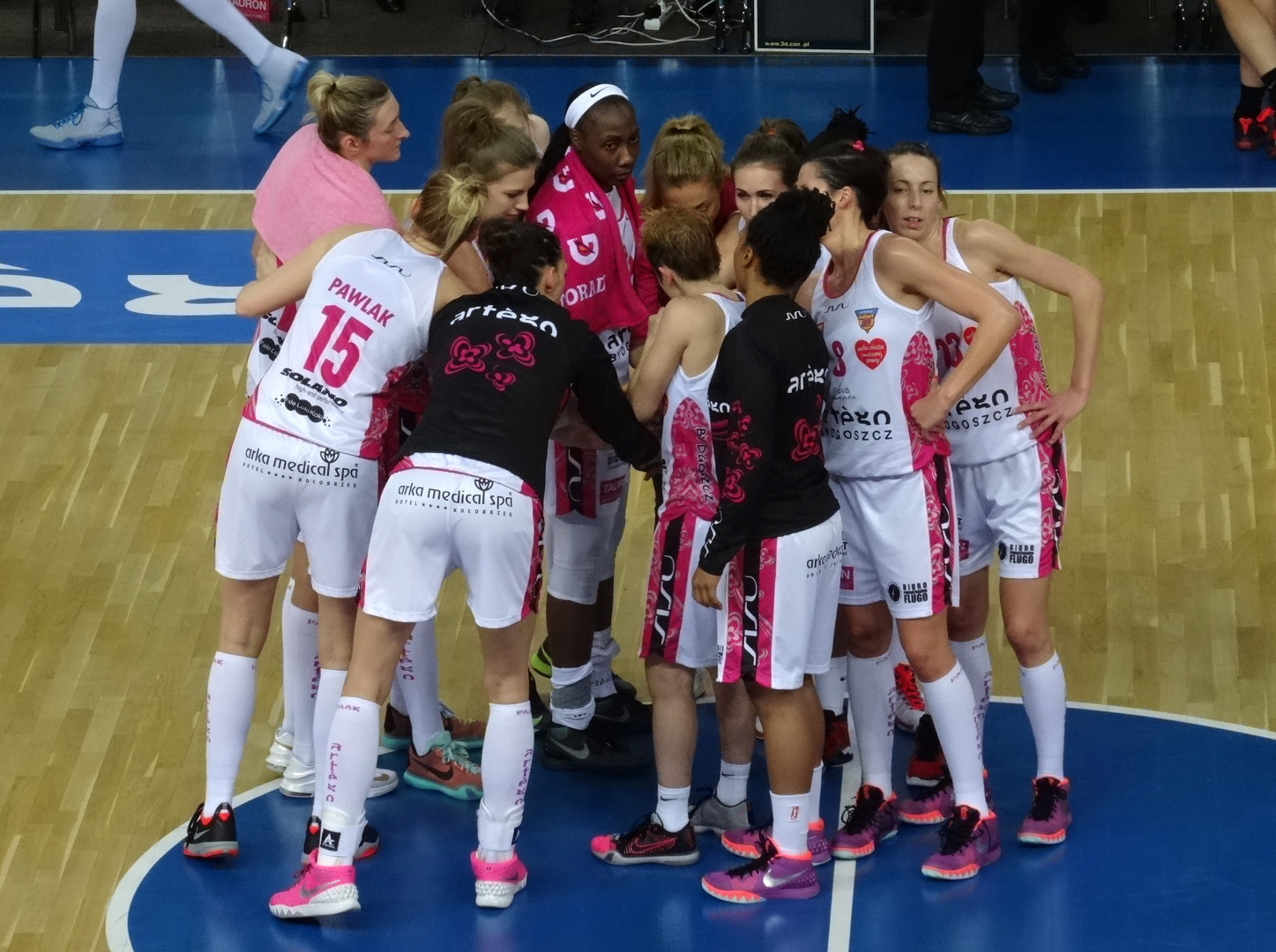
Artego Bydgoszcz in the 2015–16 season.

KS Basket 25 Bydgoszcz, known as Artego Bydgoszcz for sponsorship reasons, is a Polish professional women's basketball club that was founded in 1913 in the city of Bydgoszcz. Artego Bydgoszcz plays in the Basket Liga Kobiet, the highest competition in Poland and in the EuroCup Women.

== Honours ==
- Polish Championship:
  - Runners-up (4): 2015, 2016, 2018, 2020
  - Third place (3): 2013, 2014, 2021
- Polish Cup:
  - Winners (1): 2017–18
- EuroCup Women:
  - Round of 16: 2017–18, 2018–19, 2019–20
