= Levharti Chomutov =

Czech basketball team

- League: Czech Republic 1Liga; Czech Women's Basketball League
- Founded: 1946
- Arena: Městská sportovní hala Chomutov (capacity: 2,000)
- Location: Chomutov, Czech Republic
- Team colors: White and Navy
- Championships: 1 Men's Czech Republic 1Liga: 2011; 1 Women's EWBL: 2023
- Website: www.bk-chomutov.cz

Levharti Chomutov is a Czech professional basketball club based in the city of Chomutov. They play in the 1. Liga – the second highest competition in the Czech Republic. The club hosts both a men's and women's team, the men's team is referred to as Levharti Chomutov while the women's team is referred to as DSK Levhartice Chomutov.

== Men's team history ==
The men's team was founded in 1946. The team plays in Czech Republic 1 Basketbalova Liga. Levharti Chomutov was Czech Republic 1. Liga Champions in 2011. Additionally, the team was 1. Liga semifinalists in 2010 and regular season champions in 2011.

== Women's team history ==
The women's team was founded in 2019. The team currently plays in the Czech Republic's Czech Women's Basketball League, also known as the ZBL. DSK Levhartice Chomutov were EWBL champions in 2023. Levhartice Chomutov were also semifinalists in the Slovak-Czech Federal Cup in 2024 and 2025. In 2023, the team was Czech Republic D1 semifinalists and Czech Republic Cup finalist.

== Roster ==
Note: Flags indicate national team eligibility at FIBA-sanctioned events. Players may hold other non-FIBA nationalities not displayed.

Levharti Chomutov roster
Players
Coaches

Pos.	No.	Nat.	Name	Ht.
PG	4	(United States)	Glover, Showron	1.80 m (5 ft 11 in)
SF	6	(Czech Republic)	Štěpánek, Jan	1.90 m (6 ft 3 in)
SF	7	(United States)	Allen, Curtis	1.93 m (6 ft 4 in)
PF	11	(Czech Republic)	Staněk, Pavel	2.02 m (6 ft 8 in)
PF	12	(Czech Republic)	Truhlář, Daniel	2.00 m (6 ft 7 in)
SF	13	(Czech Republic)	Žampach, Adam	1.97 m (6 ft 6 in)
SG	14	(Czech Republic)	Hartman, Jan	1.93 m (6 ft 4 in)
SF	16	(Czech Republic)	Bosák, Pavel	1.92 m (6 ft 4 in)
SG	17	(Czech Republic)	Halada, Filip	1.98 m (6 ft 6 in)
PF	44	(Czech Republic)	Pecka, Ladislav	1.98 m (6 ft 6 in)
C	52	(United States)	Fields, John	2.05 m (6 ft 9 in)
PG	53	(Czech Republic)	Honomichl, Václav	1.86 m (6 ft 1 in)

Head coach

- (Czech Republic) Tomáš Eisner

Legend

- (C) Team captain
- Injured

- Roster
