= Magnolia Basket Campobasso =

Magnolia Campobasso
- Leagues: Serie A1
- Founded: 2018
- Arena: La Molisana Arena (capacity: 1,300)
- Location: Campobasso, Italy
- Team colors: Red and Blue
- President: (Italy) Antonella Palmieri
- Head coach: (Italy) Domenico Sabatelli
- Website: https://www.magnoliabasket.it/
Home	Away

The Magnolia Basket Campobasso is a professional women's basketball club based in Campobasso, Italy. The team was founded in 2018. currently plays in the Serie A1.

== Team history ==
The team was founded in 2017 in the Campobasso. Since its foundation, the main sponsor of the team has been La Molisana, and it has had Domenico "Mimmo" Sabatelli as its coach. The team's name is inspired by the film Steel Magnolias.

The team entered in the Serie A2 championship, the second division of the Italian women's basketball championship in the 2017–2018 season. It made its debut in the South Group and in its first season, reached the promotion play-offs, but lost in the quarter-finals against Matteiplast Bologna.

In the 2018–2019 season it finished second, just two points behind the leaders Carispezia Cestistica Spezzina. Qualifying for the playoffs again, the team managed to overcome PF Umbertide, but lost again against Matteiplast Bologna in the semifinals.

When the 2019–2020 edition was cancelled due to the COVID-19 pandemic, the team was in first place in their group. The withdrawal of Verga Palermo and Pallacanestro Torino to participate in the following Serie A1 championship left two vacancies in the top division, which allowed Magnolia Basket Campobasso to enter the top division for the first time ever, becoming the first team from Molise to participate in the Serie A1 of the Italian women's basketball championship.

The debut season in Serie A1 2020–2021 ended with the team avoiding relegation by finishing ninth, while in the next three seasons the team entered the play-offs, reaching the semi-finals in 2024.

The team entered the EuroCup Women for the first time in the 2021–22 season, but failed to reach the regular season after being defeated by Duran Maquinaria Ensino Lugo in the qualification round.

The team re-entered the EuroCup Women for the 2024–25 season. The team managed to reach the knockout stages but were eliminated in Play Off Round 1 by Spar Girona.

== Players ==
=== Current roster ===
Note: Flags indicate national team eligibility at FIBA-sanctioned events. Players may hold other non-FIBA nationalities not displayed.

Magnolia Campobasso roster
Players
Coaches

Pos.	No.	Nat.	Name	Ht.	Age
F	0	(Poland)	Ziemborska, Aleksandra	1.82 m (6 ft 0 in)	25 – 2 March 2000
C	3	(Nigeria)	Kunaiyi-Akpannah, Pallas	1.88 m (6 ft 2 in)	27 – 12 July 1997
PG	4	(Italy)	Giacchetti, Emma	1.78 m (5 ft 10 in)	17 – 18 March 2007
G	7	(Italy)	Kacerik, Martina	1.81 m (5 ft 11 in)	28 – 16 July 1996
F	8	(Colombia)	Moscarella, Marta	1.89 m (6 ft 2 in)	17 – 9 October 2007
PG	9	(Italy)	Trimboli, Stefania	1.76 m (5 ft 9 in)	28 – 30 October 1996
C	10	(Latvia)	Meldere, Laura	1.91 m (6 ft 3 in)	23 – 1 June 2001
F	11	(Ecuador)	Quinonez, Blanca	1.86 m (6 ft 1 in)	18 – 3 August 2006
F	12	(Italy)	Cere, Beatrice	1.82 m (6 ft 0 in)	17 – 31 March 2007
G	14	(United States)	Scalia, Sara	1.78 m (5 ft 10 in)	23 – 22 May 2001
F/C	15	(Italy)	Grande, Francesca	1.86 m (6 ft 1 in)	18 – 3 April 2006
F/C	20	(Italy)	Madera, Sara	1.90 m (6 ft 3 in)	24 – 28 June 2000
PG	23	(United States)	Morrison, Que	1.71 m (5 ft 7 in)	36 – 20 October 1988
G	33	(Italy)	Bocchetti, Benedetta	1.76 m (5 ft 9 in)	19 – 13 March 2006

Head coach

- (Italy) Domenico Sabatelli

Assistant coach(es)

- (Italy) Justin Altobelli

Legend

- (C) Team captain
- Injured

- Roster
Updated: 13 November 2024
