= ASVEL Féminin =

Lyon
- Nickname: Les Lionnes
- League: La Boulangère Wonderligue
- Founded: 2000
- Arena: Gymnase Mado Bonnet (capacity: 1,400)
- Location: Lyon, France
- Team colors: Pink, white and black
- President: (France) Tony Parker (France) Marie-Sophie Obama
- Head coach: (France) Yoann Cabioc'h
- Championships: 2 French League; 1 French Cup

LDLC ASVEL Féminin (formerly Lyon Basket féminin and FC Lyon Basket féminin) is a French professional women's basketball club from the Lyon suburb Villeurbanne. LDLC is a French e-commerce company (founded by Laurent de la Clergerie) that sponsors the club. ASVEL stands for Association Sportive de Villeurbanne Éveil Lyonnais, an acronym combining ASV and EL (Lyon Awakening) that merged into one club. LDLC ASVEL is the men's basketball team owned by the same ASVEL multi-sport company.

ASVEL won the EuroCup Women in the 2022–23 season, after beating Galatasaray in the finals and becoming the fourth French team to win the competition.

== Honours ==
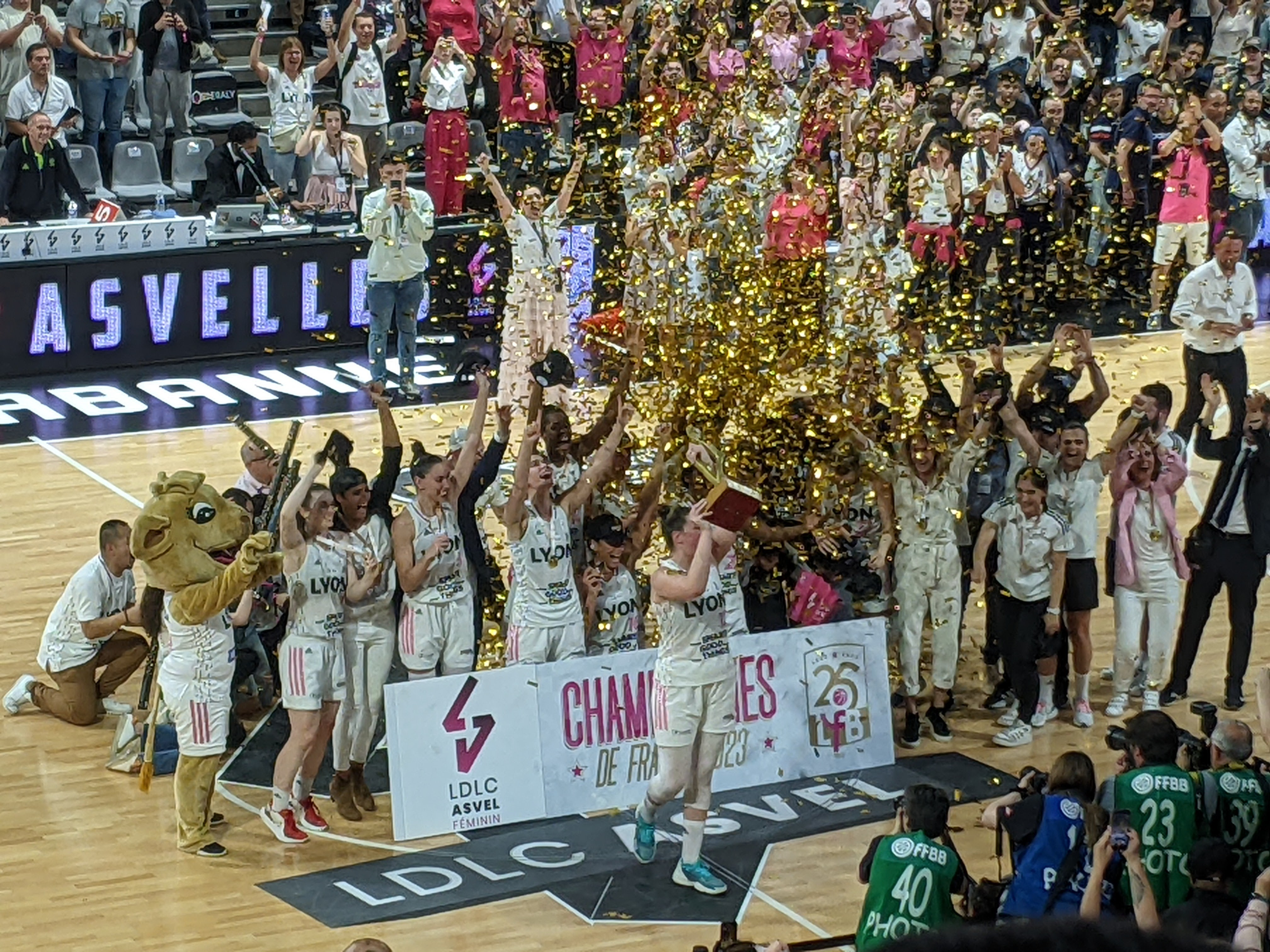
ASVEL Féminin celebrating the 2023 Ligue Féminine victory.

=== National competitions ===
- Ligue Féminine
  - Winners (2): 2019, 2023
- French Cup
  - Winners (1): 1960
  - Runner-up (2) : 2020, 2023
- Match des Champions
  - Winners (1): 2019
- Challenge round
  - Winners (1): 2014
- National 1 (French 3rd division)
  - Winners (1): 2009

=== International competitions ===
- EuroCup Women
  - Champions (1): 2022–23

== Current roster ==
Note: Flags indicate national team eligibility at FIBA-sanctioned events. Players may hold other non-FIBA nationalities not displayed.

LDLC ASVEL Féminin roster
Players
Coaches

Pos.	No.	Nat.	Name	Ht.	Age
PG	1	(United States)	Harris, Dayshanette	1.70 m (5 ft 7 in)	25 – 20 October 2000
PF	2	(United States)	Wojta, Julie	1.83 m (6 ft 0 in)	37 – 9 April 1989
F	4	(Lithuania)	Jocytė, Justė	1.84 m (6 ft 0 in)	20 – 19 November 2005
F	6	(France)	Mouyokolo, Justine	1.85 m (6 ft 1 in)	22 – 1 July 2004
PG	8	(Italy)	Pasa, Francesca	1.75 m (5 ft 9 in)	26 – 22 May 2000
F/PF	9	(Spain)	Quevedo, Laura	1.83 m (6 ft 0 in)	30 – 15 April 1996
CG	10	(France)	Risacher, Aïnhoa	1.85 m (6 ft 1 in)	19 – 13 July 2007
C	14	(France)	Malonga, Dominique	1.97 m (6 ft 6 in)	20 – 16 November 2005
PF	18	(France)	Elenga, Kekelly	1.86 m (6 ft 1 in)	31 – 18 April 1995
PG	19	(France)	Cleante, Tea	1.76 m (5 ft 9 in)	20 – 15 April 2006
PF	38	(France)	Lucet, Soana	1.86 m (6 ft 1 in)	39 – 10 March 1987

Head coach

- (France) Yoann Cabioc'h

Legend

- (C) Team captain
- Injured

- Roster
Updated: 19 September 2024

== Notable players ==
- (Australia) Rebecca Allen
- (Belgium) Julie Vanloo
- (Cameroon) Monique Akoa Makani
- (France) Sandrine Gruda
- (France) Audrey Sauret
- (Gabon) Geraldine Robert
- (Serbia) Milica Dabović
- (Serbia) Aleksandra Crvendakić
- (United States) Haley Peters
- (United States) (Israel) Alysha Clark
