= Ślęza Wrocław (women's basketball) =

- League: Basket Liga Kobiet
- Founded: 1953
- Arena: KGHM Ślęza Arena
- Location: Wrocław, Poland
- Team colors: Yellow and Red
- President: (Poland) Katarzyna Ziobro
- Head coach: (Poland) Maciej Maciejewski
- Championships: 2 Polish Championships
- Website: https://koszykowka.slezawroclaw.pl

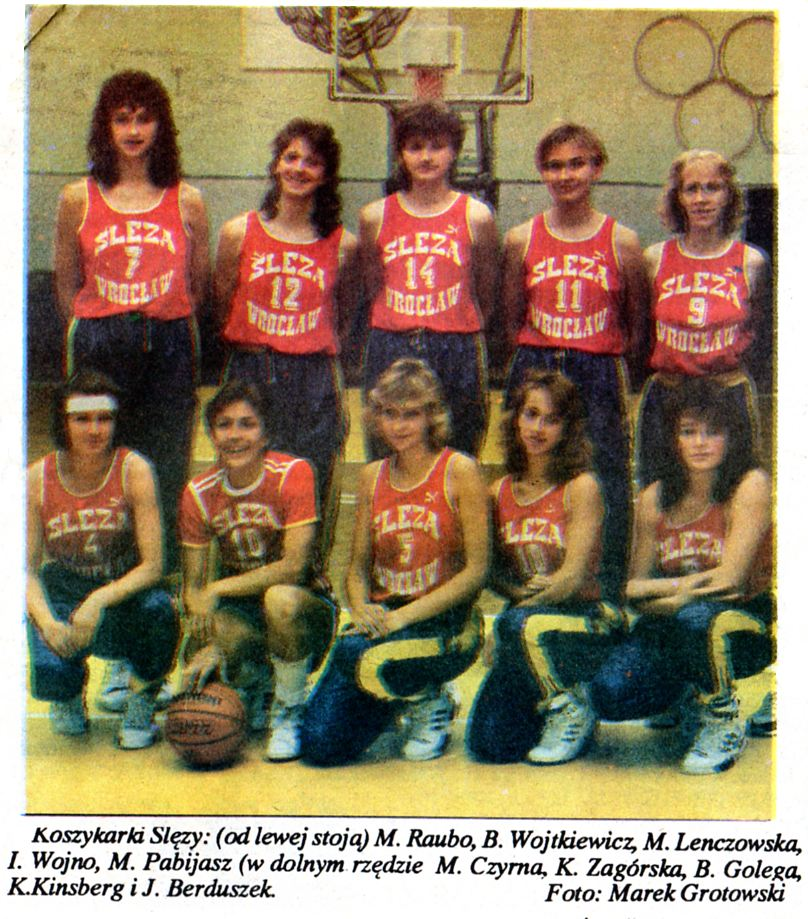
Ślęza Wrocław in 1990.

1 Klub Sportowy Ślęza Wrocław Spółka Akcyjna, also simplified to 1KS Ślęza Wrocław or Ślęza Wrocław, is a Polish professional women's basketball club that was founded in 1953 in the city of Wrocław. Ślęza Wrocław plays in the Basket Liga Kobiet, the highest competition in Poland. In the 2017–18 season, the team competed in the EuroCup Women.

== Honours ==
- Polish Championship:
  - Champions (2): 1987, 2017
  - Runners-up (4): 1982, 1984, 1985, 1986
  - Third place (5): 1993, 2001, 2002, 2016, 2025
- Polish Cup:
  - Winners (1): 2026
  - Runners-up (3): 1999, 2016, 2017

== Notable players ==
- (Latvia) Elīna Dikaioulaku
- (United States) Sydney Colson
