= Union Féminine Angers Basket 49 =

Angers
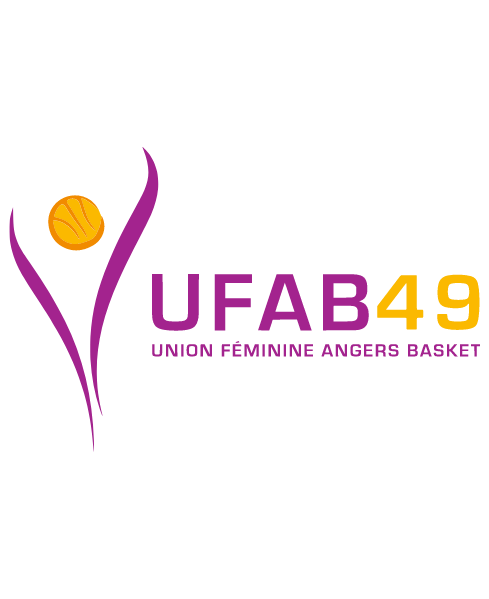
- Leagues: La Boulangère Wonderligue
- Founded: 2004
- Arena: Salle Jean Bouin (capacity: 3,000)
- Location: Angers, France
- Team colors: White and Purple
- President: Brito de Sousa
- Head coach: (France) Aurelie Bonnan
- Website: https://www.ufab49.com/
Home	Away

The Union féminine Angers Basket 49 or UFAB 49 is a French professional women's basketball club from Angers that currently plays in the La Boulangère Wonderligue (French's first division for women's basketball).

== Titles ==
- Ligue Féminine de Basketball

Champions (2): 2012–13, 2020–21

- Coupe de France

Champions (2): 2010,2012

== Players ==
=== Current roster ===
Note: Flags indicate national team eligibility at FIBA-sanctioned events. Players may hold other non-FIBA nationalities not displayed.

Angers Basket 49 Women's Union (La Boulangère Wonderligue) roster
Players
Coaches

Pos.	No.	Nat.	Name	Ht.	Age
G/F	0	(France)	Ngo Ndjock, Anna	1.76 m (5 ft 9 in)	26 – 14 January 1999
F/C	4	(France)	Merceron, Axelle	1.89 m (6 ft 2 in)	21 – 24 April 2003
G/F	7	(Spain)	Mendez, Laura	1.73 m (5 ft 8 in)	23 – 21 October 2001
G/F	8	(France)	Dursus, Marine	1.76 m (5 ft 9 in)	19 – 26 August 2005
SF	10	(France)	Nguinabe, Imani	1.80 m (5 ft 11 in)	16 – 10 October 2008
C	11	(Canada)	Dornstauder, Quinn	1.93 m (6 ft 4 in)	29 – 16 August 1995
G	22	(United States)	Alston, Ameryst	1.75 m (5 ft 9 in)	26 – 20 June 1998
C	23	(France)	Diarisso, Oumou	1.89 m (6 ft 2 in)	22 – 5 January 2003
F	24	(United States)	Adams, Joy	1.80 m (5 ft 11 in)	31 – 28 May 1993
PF	31	(France)	Tahane, Emmanuelle	1.83 m (6 ft 0 in)	25 – 13 May 1999
F	66	(France)	Petiteau, Lana	1.76 m (5 ft 9 in)	18 – 27 June 2006
SF	91	(France)	Bayssière, Jade	1.76 m (5 ft 9 in)	18 – 17 May 2006

Head coach

- (France) Aurelie Bonnan

Assistant coach(es)

- (France) Marius Blanchard

Legend

- (C) Team captain
- Injured

- Roster
Updated: 17 September 2024
