= AZS UMCS Lublin =

Klub Uczelniany Akademickiego Związku Sportowego Uniwersytetu Marii Curie-Skłodowskiej w Lublinie or KU AZS UMCS Lublin is a Polish university multi-sports club based in Lublin. It is the university sports club for the Maria Curie-Skłodowska University. Top departments include athletics, swimming and women's basketball. It is one of the top athletics clubs in Poland. The women's basketball team competes in the Basket Liga Kobiet, the country's top division, and is the current title holder (as of 2025–26).

Other team sports departments include men's and women's handball, men's futsal and women's volleyball.

== Women's basketball ==
The top team sport department of AZS UMCS is women's basketball. The team competes in the Basket Liga Kobiet, the country's top division (as of 2025–26). It debuted in the top division in the 1965–1966 season. It won its first Polish Cup in the 2015–16 season. In the 2022–23 season, AZS UMCS won its first Polish Championship, thus qualifying to the 2023–24 EuroLeague Women, and followed the success by winning the 2023 Polish Supercup.

== Honours ==
- Athletics
  - Polish Club Champions:
    - Winners: 2019, 2020
    - Runners-up: 2022, 2023
    - Third place: 2018, 2021
- Women's basketball
  - Basket Liga Kobiet:
    - Champions: 2023, 2026
    - Runners-up: 2022
  - Polish Cup
    - Winners: 2016
    - Runners-up: 2024
  - Polish Supercup
    - Winners: 2023
