= 2026–27 EuroCup Women =

European women's basketball tournament

EuroCup Women
- Season: 2026–27
- Dates: Qualifying: 24 September – 1 October 2026; Regular season: 15 October – 3 December 2026; Knockout stage: 7 January – 8 April 2027
- Teams: Regular season: 48; Knockout stage: 32; Total: 57 (from 21 countries)

The 2026–27 EuroCup Women will be the 56th edition of FIBA Europe's second-tier international competition for European women's basketball clubs, and the 25th season since it was renamed from the Ronchetti Cup to the EuroCup Women. The season will begin on 24 September 2026 and end on 8 April 2027 with the Final.

The winners of the EuroCup Women qualify for the 2027 SuperCup and automatically qualify for next season's edition of this tournament, unless they participate in the EuroLeague Women instead.

ÇİMSA ÇBK Mersin are the defending champions, having won their first title from the previous season.

== Format ==
- Regular season

After the qualifiers, 48 teams are divided into 12 groups of 4. The groups are held in a double home and away format. The top 2 plus the 4 best third place teams advancing to the knockout stage.

- Knockout stage

In the knockout stage, the 28 teams, plus the 4 who dropped down from the Euroleague Women, are seeded based on their results in the regular season. Each tie in the knockout stage is played in a home and away format, where the winner on aggregate wins the tie and advances to the next round.

== Rankings ==
The results are based on the results of the past three seasons.

- Associations 1–5 can register five teams.
- Associations 6–10 can register four teams.
- Associations below the top 10 can register three teams.

Apart from the distribution based on the rankings, countries could have additional teams participating in the EuroCup Women, as noted below:

- (EL) – Additional teams dropping down from the EuroLeague Women

Rank	Association	Average points	Teams	Notes
1	(Turkish Basketball Federation) Turkey	262.00	2	
2	(Spanish Basketball Federation) Spain	201.67	5	
3	(French Federation of Basketball) France	184.00	5	
4	(Czech Basketball Federation) Czech Republic	109.67	3	
5	(Italian Basketball Federation) Italy	106.67	3	
6	(Hungarian Basketball Federation) Hungary	66.00	0	
7	(Polish Basketball Federation) Poland	51.33	2	
8	(Hellenic Basketball Federation) Greece	34.67	4	
9	(Basketball Belgium) Belgium	25.33	2	
10	(Romanian Basketball Federation) Romania	18.67	1	
11	(British Basketball) Great Britain	17.33	0	
12	(Lithuanian Basketball Federation) Lithuania	15.33	0	
13	(German Basketball Federation) Germany	13.33	3	

Rank	Association	Average points	Teams	Notes
14	(Portuguese Basketball Federation) Portugal	10.00	1	
14	(Latvian Basketball Association) Latvia	10.00	1	
16	(Israeli Basketball Association) Israel	9.33	2	
17	(Basketball Federation of Serbia) Serbia	8.67	1	
17	(Swiss Basketball) Switzerland	8.67	3	
19	(Slovak Basketball Association) Slovakia	7.33	1	
20	(Croatian Basketball Federation) Croatia	4.00	1	
21	(Luxembourg Basketball Federation) Luxembourg	2.67	0	
22	(Basketball Federation of Kosovo) Kosovo	2.00	0	
23	(Bulgarian Basketball Federation) Bulgaria	1.33	2	
23	(Cyprus Basketball Federation) Cyprus	1.33	1	
23	(Basketball Finland) Finland	1.33	1	
23	(Basketball Federation of Armenia) Armenia	1.33	0	
N/A	(Basketball Federation of Slovenia) Slovenia	0.00	1	

== Teams ==
The labels in the parentheses show how each team qualified for the place of its starting round:

- TH EL: EuroLeague Women title holders
- TH EC: EuroCup Women title holders
- 1st, 2nd, 3rd etc.: League position of the previous season
- RS: Regular season winners
- CW: Cup winners
- CR: Cup runners-up

The teams with the S in the qualification round means they were seeded. Teams with EL took part in the EuroLeague Women qualification round or the regular season.

The teams were announced on 6 July 2026, with a total of 45 clubs registering for the competition. Since the previous season, winners of the previous season can take part, regardless of their performance in their domestic league.

Play Off Round 1
(N/A) TBD ^{EL}	(N/A) TBD ^{EL}	(N/A) TBD ^{EL}	(N/A) TBD ^{EL}
Regular season
(Hungarian Basketball Federation) Sopron Basket ^{EL}	(Hungarian Basketball Federation) DVTK HUN-Therm ^{EL}	(Spanish Basketball Federation) Spar Girona ^{EL}	(Italian Basketball Federation) Umana Reyer Venezia ^{EL}
(Polish Basketball Federation) AZS Poznań ^{EL}	(Czech Basketball Federation) Žabiny Brno ^{EL}	(Hellenic Basketball Federation) Panathinaikos AC ^{EL}	(Czech Basketball Federation) KP Brno ^{EL}
(Turkish Basketball Federation) ÇBK Mersin ^{TH EC} (4th)	(Turkish Basketball Federation) Beşiktaş (5th)	(Spanish Basketball Federation) Hozono Global Jairis (4th)	(Spanish Basketball Federation) Meins Avenida (5th)
(Spanish Basketball Federation) Durán Maquinaria Ensino (6th)	(French Federation of Basketball) Landerneau Bretagne (4th)	(French Federation of Basketball) BLMA (5th)	(French Federation of Basketball) Villeneuve-d'Ascq LM (6th)
(French Federation of Basketball) Charnay Basket (7th)	(Czech Basketball Federation) SBŠ Ostrava (4th)	(Czech Basketball Federation) DSK Basketball Brandýs (5th)	(Italian Basketball Federation) Magnolia Basket Campobasso (3rd)
(Italian Basketball Federation) BCC Derthona Basket (4th)	(Polish Basketball Federation) KS AZS AJP Gorzów (3rd)	(Polish Basketball Federation) Ślęza Wrocław (4th)	(Hellenic Basketball Federation) Olympiacos SFP (3rd)
(Hellenic Basketball Federation) Panathlitikos Sykeon (4th)	(Hellenic Basketball Federation) Panserraikos (5th)	(Basketball Belgium) Basket Namur Capitale (2nd)	(Basketball Belgium) Castors Braine (3rd)
(Romanian Basketball Federation) CS Universitatea Cluj (5th)	(German Basketball Federation) Rutronik Stars Keltern (1st)	(German Basketball Federation) Alba Berlin (3rd)	(Portuguese Basketball Federation) SL Benfica (1st)
(Latvian Basketball Association) TTT Riga (1st)	(Israeli Basketball Association) Maccabi Bnot Ashdod (3rd)	(Basketball Federation of Serbia) ŽKK Student Niš (2nd)	(Swiss Basketball) Nyon Basket Feminin (1st)
(Swiss Basketball) BCF Elfic Fribourg (2nd)	(Slovak Basketball Association) MBK Ružomberok (1st)	(Croatian Basketball Federation) ŽKK Brod na Savi (1st)	(Bulgarian Basketball Federation) WBC Montana 2003 (1st)
(Cyprus Basketball Federation) AEL Limassol (1st)	(Basketball Finland) Helsinki Basketball Academy (2nd)	(Basketball Federation of Slovenia) Cinkarna Celje (1st)	
Qualification round
(Spanish Basketball Federation) Impulso 360 Estepona (8th)	(Spanish Basketball Federation) Baxi Ferrol ^{S} (9th)	(French Federation of Basketball) Chartres Basket (8th)	(Czech Basketball Federation) Levhartice Chomutov ^{S} (6th)
(Italian Basketball Federation) GEAS Basket ^{S} (6th)	(Hellenic Basketball Federation) Proteas Voulas (6th)	(German Basketball Federation) Saarlouis Royals ^{S} (5th)	(Israeli Basketball Association) Elitzur Ramla ^{S} (5th)
(Swiss Basketball) Ravens de Geneve (5th)	(Bulgarian Basketball Federation) Beroe Stara Zagora (3rd)		

== Round and draw dates ==
=== Schedule ===
Phase	Draw date	Round	Round date
Qualification round	16 July 2026	First leg	24 September 2026
Qualification round	16 July 2026	Second leg	1 October 2026
Regular season	16 July 2026	Matchday 1	15 October 2026
Regular season	16 July 2026	Matchday 2	22 October 2026
Regular season	16 July 2026	Matchday 3	29 October 2026
Regular season	16 July 2026	Matchday 4	4 November 2026
Regular season	16 July 2026	Matchday 5	26 November 2026
Regular season	16 July 2026	Matchday 6	3 December 2026
Play-off round 1	16 July 2026	First leg	7 January 2027
Play-off round 1	16 July 2026	Second leg	14 January 2027
Round of 16	16 July 2026	First leg	28 January 2027
Round of 16	16 July 2026	Second leg	3 February 2027
Quarterfinals	16 July 2026	First leg	25 February 2027
Quarterfinals	16 July 2026	Second leg	4 March 2027
Semifinals	16 July 2026	First leg	11 March 2027
Semifinals	16 July 2026	Second leg	18 March 2027
Finals	16 July 2026	First leg	1 April 2027
Finals	16 July 2026	Second leg	8 April 2027

=== Draw ===
The seeding was announced on 10 July 2026. The draw took place in Munich, Germany, on 16 July 2026. Only a maximum of one club from the same country can be in the same regular season group.

Seed 1	Seed 2	Seed 3	Seed 4
(N/A) ELW Qualifiers 1 (Note: The eventual team in this slot was Sopron Basket.) (N/A) ELW Qualifiers 2 (Note: The eventual team in this slot was DVTK HUN-Therm.) (N/A) ELW Qualifiers 3 (Note: The eventual team in this slot was Spar Girona.) (N/A) ELW Qualifiers 4 (Note: The eventual team in this slot was Umana Reyer Venezia.) (N/A) ELW Qualifiers 5 (Note: The eventual team in this slot was AZS Poznań.) (N/A) ELW Qualifiers 6 (Note: The eventual team in this slot was Žabiny Brno.) (N/A) ELW Qualifiers 7 (Note: The eventual team in this slot was Panathinaikos AC.) (N/A) ELW Qualifiers 8 (Note: The eventual team in this slot was KP Brno.) (Turkish Basketball Federation) ÇBK Mersin (French Federation of Basketball) Villeneuve-d'Ascq LM (Spanish Basketball Federation) Meins Avenida (French Federation of Basketball) BLMA	(Turkish Basketball Federation) Beşiktaş (Basketball Belgium) Castors Braine (Hellenic Basketball Federation) Olympiacos SFP (German Basketball Federation) Rutronik Stars Keltern (Latvian Basketball Association) TTT Riga (Polish Basketball Federation) KS AZS AJP Gorzów (Spanish Basketball Federation) Hozono Global Jairis (French Federation of Basketball) Charnay Basket (Italian Basketball Federation) Magnolia Basket Campobasso (Swiss Basketball) BCF Elfic Fribourg (Basketball Belgium) Basket Namur Capitale (Portuguese Basketball Federation) SL Benfica	(Polish Basketball Federation) Ślęza Wrocław (Czech Basketball Federation) SBŠ Ostrava (Romanian Basketball Federation) CS Universitatea Cluj (Basketball Federation of Serbia) ŽKK Student Niš (German Basketball Federation) Alba Berlin (Swiss Basketball) Nyon Basket Feminin (Slovak Basketball Association) MBK Ružomberok (Cyprus Basketball Federation) AEL Limassol (Czech Basketball Federation) DSK Basketball Brandýs (Hellenic Basketball Federation) Panathlitikos Sykeon (Spanish Basketball Federation) Durán Maquinaria Ensino (French Federation of Basketball) Landerneau Bretagne	(Italian Basketball Federation) BCC Derthona Basket (Hellenic Basketball Federation) Panserraikos (Israeli Basketball Association) Maccabi Bnot Ashdod (Croatian Basketball Federation) ŽKK Brod na Savi (Bulgarian Basketball Federation) WBC Montana 2003 (Basketball Finland) Helsinki Basketball Academy (Basketball Federation of Slovenia) Cinkarna Celje (N/A) ECW Qualifiers 1 (Note: The eventual team in this slot was Baxi Ferrol.) (N/A) ECW Qualifiers 2 (Note: The eventual team in this slot was Chartres Basket.) (N/A) ECW Qualifiers 3 (Note: The eventual team in this slot was Elitzur Ramla.) (N/A) ECW Qualifiers 4 (Note: The eventual team in this slot was Saarlouis Royals.) (N/A) ECW Qualifiers 5 (Note: The eventual team in this slot was GEAS Basket.)

== Qualification round ==
The draw for the qualification round was conducted on 16 July 2025. The winners advance to the regular season while the losers are eliminated.

Team 1	Agg.	Team 2	1st leg	2nd leg
Baxi Ferrol (Spain)	161–119	(Bulgaria) Beroe Stara Zagora	76–61	85–58
Levhartice Chomutov (Czech Republic)	111–167	(France) Chartres Basket	66–80	45–87
Elitzur Ramla (Israel)	167–102	(Greece) Proteas Voulas	79–46	88–56
Saarlouis Royals (Germany)	186–131	(Switzerland) Ravens de Geneve	109–75	77–56
GEAS Basket (Italy)	152–136	(Spain) Impulso 360 Estepona	76–65	76–71

== Regular season ==
Location of teams of the 2026–27 EuroCup Women regular season.
Brown: Group A; Green: Group B; Deep Pink: Group C; Yellow: Group D;
Red: Group E; Cyan: Group F; Blue: Group G; Purple: Group H;
Pink: Group I; Turquoise: Group J; Spring Green: Group K; Orange: Group L.

If teams are level on record at the end of the regular season, tiebreakers are applied in the following order:

1. Head-to-head record
2. Head-to-head point differential
3. Head-to-head points scored
4. Point differential for the entire regular season
5. Points scored for the entire regular season

=== Group A ===
Pos	Team	Pld	W	L	PF	PA	PD	Pts	Qualification	ZAB	CHA	AEL	HBA
1	(Czech Basketball Federation) Žabiny Brno	4	4	0	373	234	+139	8	Play-off Round 1	—		102–64	
2	(French Federation of Basketball) Charnay Basket	4	3	1	350	270	+80	7	Play-off Round 1	74–81	—		91–54
3	(Cyprus Basketball Federation) AEL Limassol	4	1	3	269	369	−100	5	Possible Play-off Round 1	37–95	80–93	—	88–79
4	(Basketball Finland) Helsinki Basketball Academy	4	0	4	247	366	−119	4		59–95	55–92		—

Updated to match(es) played on 4 November 2026. Source: EuroCup Women
Legend: Blue = home team win; Red = away team win.
Rules for classification: 1) Points; 2) Points difference; 3) Points scored.

=== Group B ===
Pos	Team	Pld	W	L	PF	PA	PD	Pts	Qualification	BES	VIL	MAC	DSK
1	(Turkish Basketball Federation) Beşiktaş	4	3	1	304	239	+65	7	Play-off Round 1	—	73–76	78–55	
2	(French Federation of Basketball) Villeneuve-d'Ascq LM	3	3	0	253	177	+76	6	Play-off Round 1		—		92–51
3	(Israeli Basketball Association) Maccabi Bnot Ashdod	4	2	2	243	223	+20	6	Possible Play-off Round 1	60–70		—	67–48
4	(Czech Basketball Federation) DSK Basketball Brandýs	5	0	5	227	388	−161	5		48–83	53–85	27–61	—

Updated to match(es) played on 4 November 2026. Source: EuroCup Women
Legend: Blue = home team win; Red = away team win.
Rules for classification: 1) Points; 2) Points difference; 3) Points scored.

=== Group C ===
Pos	Team	Pld	W	L	PF	PA	PD	Pts	Qualification	PAO	GEA	ALB	CAS
1	(Hellenic Basketball Federation) Panathinaikos AC	4	4	0	319	262	+57	8	Play-off Round 1	—		81–73	
2	(Italian Basketball Federation) GEAS Basket	4	2	2	292	285	+7	6	Play-off Round 1	65–75	—	72–54	80–78
3	(German Basketball Federation) Alba Berlin	4	1	3	260	300	−40	5	Possible Play-off Round 1	58–79		—	75–68
4	(Basketball Belgium) Castors Braine	4	1	3	290	314	−24	5		66–84	78–75		—

Updated to match(es) played on 4 November 2026. Source: EuroCup Women
Legend: Blue = home team win; Red = away team win.
Rules for classification: 1) Points; 2) Points difference; 3) Points scored.

=== Group D ===
Pos	Team	Pld	W	L	PF	PA	PD	Pts	Qualification	CBK	OLY	BAX	SLE
1	(Turkish Basketball Federation) ÇBK Mersin	4	4	0	346	233	+113	8	Play-off Round 1	—			72–59
2	(Hellenic Basketball Federation) Olympiacos SFP	4	3	1	313	283	+30	7	Play-off Round 1	62–89	—	96–68	
3	(Spanish Basketball Federation) Baxi Ferrol	4	1	3	255	323	−68	5	Possible Play-off Round 1	42–85	58–77	—	
4	(Polish Basketball Federation) Ślęza Wrocław	4	0	4	262	337	−75	4		70–100	68–78	65–87	—

Updated to match(es) played on 4 November 2026. Source: EuroCup Women
Legend: Blue = home team win; Red = away team win.
Rules for classification: 1) Points; 2) Points difference; 3) Points scored.

=== Group E ===
Pos	Team	Pld	W	L	PF	PA	PD	Pts	Qualification	JAI	DVTK	PAN	BRO
1	(Spanish Basketball Federation) Hozono Global Jairis	4	4	0	375	197	+178	8	Play-off Round 1	—	89–48	98–51	79–44
2	(Hungarian Basketball Federation) DVTK HUN-Therm	4	3	1	270	257	+13	7	Play-off Round 1		—	56–38	
3	(Hellenic Basketball Federation) Panathlitikos Sykeon	4	1	3	242	294	−52	5	Possible Play-off Round 1		74–77	—	79–63
4	(Croatian Basketball Federation) ŽKK Brod na Savi	4	0	4	217	356	−139	4		54–109	56–89		—

Updated to match(es) played on 4 November 2026. Source: EuroCup Women
Legend: Blue = home team win; Red = away team win.
Rules for classification: 1) Points; 2) Points difference; 3) Points scored.

=== Group F ===
Pos	Team	Pld	W	L	PF	PA	PD	Pts	Qualification	REY	RAM	TTT	UNI
1	(Italian Basketball Federation) Umana Reyer Venezia	5	4	1	441	293	+148	9	Play-off Round 1	—	64–67	43–96	111–47
2	(Israeli Basketball Association) Elitzur Ramla	4	2	2	288	299	−11	6	Play-off Round 1	64–79	—	75–80	
3	(Latvian Basketball Association) TTT Riga	4	2	2	312	310	+2	6	Possible Play-off Round 1	72–91	76–82	—	
4	(Romanian Basketball Federation) CS Universitatea Cluj	3	0	3	152	291	−139	3				62–84	—

Updated to match(es) played on 4 November 2026. Source: EuroCup Women
Legend: Blue = home team win; Red = away team win.
Rules for classification: 1) Points; 2) Points difference; 3) Points scored.

=== Group G ===
Pos	Team	Pld	W	L	PF	PA	PD	Pts	Qualification	MAG	NYO	CEL	BRN
1	(Italian Basketball Federation) Magnolia Basket Campobasso	4	3	1	311	233	+78	7	Play-off Round 1	—		75–53	100–58
2	(Swiss Basketball) Nyon Basket Feminin	4	2	2	261	281	−20	6	Play-off Round 1	59–77	—	63–57	79–75
3	(Basketball Federation of Slovenia) Cinkarna Celje	4	2	2	265	259	+6	6	Possible Play-off Round 1	63–59		—	92–62
4	(Czech Basketball Federation) KP Brno	4	1	3	267	331	−64	5			72–60		—

Updated to match(es) played on 4 November 2026. Source: EuroCup Women
Legend: Blue = home team win; Red = away team win.
Rules for classification: 1) Points; 2) Points difference; 3) Points scored.

=== Group H ===
Pos	Team	Pld	W	L	PF	PA	PD	Pts	Qualification	DER	POZ	LAN	FRI
1	(Italian Basketball Federation) BCC Derthona Basket	4	4	0	299	253	+46	8	Play-off Round 1	—	73–64		82–61
2	(Polish Basketball Federation) AZS Poznań	4	3	1	304	289	+15	7	Play-off Round 1		—	77–65	
3	(French Federation of Basketball) Landerneau Bretagne	4	1	3	292	289	+3	5	Possible Play-off Round 1	68–73	71–76	—	83–63
4	(Swiss Basketball) BCF Elfic Fribourg	4	0	4	264	328	−64	4		60–71	80–87		—

Updated to match(es) played on 4 November 2026. Source: EuroCup Women
Legend: Blue = home team win; Red = away team win.
Rules for classification: 1) Points; 2) Points difference; 3) Points scored.

=== Group I ===
Pos	Team	Pld	W	L	PF	PA	PD	Pts	Qualification	BEN	SOP	SAA	STU
1	(Portuguese Basketball Federation) SL Benfica	4	4	0	284	254	+30	8	Play-off Round 1	—	72–62	69–65	
2	(Hungarian Basketball Federation) Sopron Basket	4	3	1	312	264	+48	7	Play-off Round 1		—		89–71
3	(German Basketball Federation) Saarlouis Royals	4	1	3	247	288	−41	5	Possible Play-off Round 1	52–61	46–83	—	
4	(Basketball Federation of Serbia) ŽKK Student Niš	4	0	4	296	333	−37	4		75–82	75–78	75–84	—

Updated to match(es) played on 4 November 2026. Source: EuroCup Women
Legend: Blue = home team win; Red = away team win.
Rules for classification: 1) Points; 2) Points difference; 3) Points scored.

=== Group J ===
Pos	Team	Pld	W	L	PF	PA	PD	Pts	Qualification	GOR	BLMA	ENS	PAN
1	(Polish Basketball Federation) KS AZS AJP Gorzów	4	4	0	359	290	+69	8	Play-off Round 1	—	77–65		87–63
2	(French Federation of Basketball) BLMA	4	2	2	330	304	+26	6	Play-off Round 1		—	89–64	
3	(Spanish Basketball Federation) Durán Maquinaria Ensino	4	2	2	313	332	−19	6	Possible Play-off Round 1	83–105	86–80	—	80–58
4	(Hellenic Basketball Federation) Panserraikos	4	0	4	277	353	−76	4		79–90	77–96		—

Updated to match(es) played on 4 November 2026. Source: EuroCup Women
Legend: Blue = home team win; Red = away team win.
Rules for classification: 1) Points; 2) Points difference; 3) Points scored.

=== Group K ===
Pos	Team	Pld	W	L	PF	PA	PD	Pts	Qualification	MON	GIR	OST	RUT
1	(Bulgarian Basketball Federation) WBC Montana 2003	4	3	1	294	254	+40	7	Play-off Round 1	—	82–73		73–66
2	(Spanish Basketball Federation) Spar Girona	4	3	1	306	244	+62	7	Play-off Round 1		—	77–49	
3	(Czech Basketball Federation) SBŠ Ostrava	4	1	3	240	322	−82	5	Possible Play-off Round 1	49–79	58–86	—	
4	(German Basketball Federation) Rutronik Stars Keltern	4	1	3	267	287	−20	5		66–60		80–84	—

Updated to match(es) played on 4 November 2026. Source: EuroCup Women
Legend: Blue = home team win; Red = away team win.
Rules for classification: 1) Points; 2) Points difference; 3) Points scored.

=== Group L ===
Pos	Team	Pld	W	L	PF	PA	PD	Pts	Qualification	CHA	AVE	NAM	RUZ
1	(French Federation of Basketball) Chartres Basket	4	3	1	327	312	+15	7	Play-off Round 1	—	102–101	83–72	
2	(Spanish Basketball Federation) Meins Avenida	4	3	1	341	270	+71	7	Play-off Round 1		—		75–64
3	(Basketball Belgium) Basket Namur Capitale	4	1	3	258	305	−47	5	Possible Play-off Round 1	60–70	55–87	—	
4	(Slovak Basketball Association) MBK Ružomberok	4	1	3	257	296	−39	5		79–72	49–78	65–71	—

Updated to match(es) played on 4 November 2026. Source: EuroCup Women
Legend: Blue = home team win; Red = away team win.
Rules for classification: 1) Points; 2) Points difference; 3) Points scored.

== Awards ==
=== Finals MVP ===
Player	Team	Ref.

=== MVP of the Month ===
Month	Player	Team	Ref.
October	(United States) Schaquilla Nunn	(Portugal) SL Benfica	
November			
December			
January			
February			
March			

=== MVP of the Round ===
==== Regular season ====
Round	PG	SG	SF	PF	C
1	(France) Stella Colas ( (France) Villeneuve-d'Ascq LM)	(United States) Kennedy Burke ( (Turkey) ÇBK Mersin)	(United States) Schaquilla Nunn ( (Portugal) SL Benfica)	(Denmark) Julianna Okosun ( (Italy) GEAS Basket)	(United States) Tyia Singleton ( (Greece) Panserraikos)
2	(United States) Taina Mair ( (Poland) KS AZS AJP Gorzów)	(United States) Aubrey Griffin ( (Latvia) TTT Riga)	(United States) Stella Johnson ( (France) BLMA)	(United States) Harmoni Turner ( (France) Landerneau Bretagne)	(France) Sarah Cissé ( (France) BLMA)
3	(United States) Cornelia Fondren ( (Italy) BCC Derthona Basket)	(United States) Sydney Shaw ( (Spain) Baxi Ferrol)	(Venezuela) Daniela Wallen ( (Bulgaria) WBC Montana 2003)	(United States) Schaquilla Nunn ( (Portugal) SL Benfica)	(Lithuania) Laura Miškinienė ( (Poland) AZS Poznań)
4	(United States) Aubrey Griffin ( (Latvia) TTT Riga)	(Spain) Alba Prieto ( (Spain) Hozono Global Jairis)	(United States) Kennedy Todd-Williams ( (Hungary) Sopron Basket)	(United States) (Turkey) Kennedy Burke ( (Turkey) ÇİMSA ÇBK Mersin)	(Denmark) Julianna Okosun ( (Italy) GEAS Basket)
5	(N/A) Player ( (N/A) Team)	(N/A) Player ( (N/A) Team)	(N/A) Player ( (N/A) Team)	(N/A) Player ( (N/A) Team)	(N/A) Player ( (N/A) Team)
6	(N/A) Player ( (N/A) Team)	(N/A) Player ( (N/A) Team)	(N/A) Player ( (N/A) Team)	(N/A) Player ( (N/A) Team)	(N/A) Player ( (N/A) Team)

==== Playoffs ====
Play-off Round 1

Round	PG	SG	SF	PF	C
First leg	(N/A) Player ( (N/A) Team)	(N/A) Player ( (N/A) Team)	(N/A) Player ( (N/A) Team)	(N/A) Player ( (N/A) Team)	(N/A) Player ( (N/A) Team)
Second leg	(N/A) Player ( (N/A) Team)	(N/A) Player ( (N/A) Team)	(N/A) Player ( (N/A) Team)	(N/A) Player ( (N/A) Team)	(N/A) Player ( (N/A) Team)

Round of 16

Round	PG	SG	SF	PF	C
First leg	(N/A) Player ( (N/A) Team)	(N/A) Player ( (N/A) Team)	(N/A) Player ( (N/A) Team)	(N/A) Player ( (N/A) Team)	(N/A) Player ( (N/A) Team)
Second leg	(N/A) Player ( (N/A) Team)	(N/A) Player ( (N/A) Team)	(N/A) Player ( (N/A) Team)	(N/A) Player ( (N/A) Team)	(N/A) Player ( (N/A) Team)

Quarterfinals

Round	PG	SG	SF	PF	C
First leg	(N/A) Player ( (N/A) Team)	(N/A) Player ( (N/A) Team)	(N/A) Player ( (N/A) Team)	(N/A) Player ( (N/A) Team)	(N/A) Player ( (N/A) Team)
Second leg	(N/A) Player ( (N/A) Team)	(N/A) Player ( (N/A) Team)	(N/A) Player ( (N/A) Team)	(N/A) Player ( (N/A) Team)	(N/A) Player ( (N/A) Team)

Semifinals

Round	PG	SG	SF	PF	C
First leg	(N/A) Player ( (N/A) Team)	(N/A) Player ( (N/A) Team)	(N/A) Player ( (N/A) Team)	(N/A) Player ( (N/A) Team)	(N/A) Player ( (N/A) Team)
Second leg	(N/A) Player ( (N/A) Team)	(N/A) Player ( (N/A) Team)	(N/A) Player ( (N/A) Team)	(N/A) Player ( (N/A) Team)	(N/A) Player ( (N/A) Team)

== See also ==
- 2026–27 EuroLeague Women
- 2026–27 EuroLeague Women regular season
- 2026–27 EuroLeague Women qualification round
- 2026 FIBA Europe SuperCup Women
- 2026–27 EuroCup Basketball
