= 2026–27 EuroCup Women regular season =

EuroCup Women regular season
- Season: 2026–27
- Dates: 15 October – 3 December 2026
- Games played: 144
- Teams: 48 (from 21 countries)

The 2026–27 EuroCup Women regular season will be played between the 15 October to 3 December 2026.

== Format ==
- Regular season

After the qualifiers, 48 teams are divided into 12 groups of 4. The groups are held in a double home and away format. The top 2 plus the 4 best third place teams advancing to the knockout stage.

== Draw ==
External videos
- Draw

The seeding was announced on 10 July 2026. The draw took place at 11:00 CET in Munich, Germany on 16 July 2026. Only a maximum of one club from the same country can be in the same regular season group. The seeding is based on the club rankings.

Key to colours
Teams advancing to the Knockout stage

Pot 1
Team	Rank	Points
(Hungarian Basketball Federation) Sopron Basket (Note: Team not known at the time of the draw. Was the Path 1 Final Loser in the EuroLeague Women qualification.)	21	38
(Hungarian Basketball Federation) DVTK HUN-Therm (Note: Team not known at the time of the draw. Was the Path 2 Final Loser in the EuroLeague Women qualification.)	14	74
(Spanish Basketball Federation) Spar Girona (Note: Team not known at the time of the draw. Was the Path 3 Final Loser in the EuroLeague Women qualification.)	9	104
(Italian Basketball Federation) Umana Reyer Venezia (Note: Team not known at the time of the draw. Was the Path 4 Final Loser in the EuroLeague Women qualification.)	11	93
(Polish Basketball Federation) AZS Poznań (Note: Team not known at the time of the draw. Was the Path 1 Semifinal Loser in the EuroLeague Women qualification.)	N/A	
(Czech Basketball Federation) Žabiny Brno (Note: Team not known at the time of the draw. Was the Path 2 Semifinal Loser in the EuroLeague Women qualification.)	21	38
(Hellenic Basketball Federation) Panathinaikos AC (Note: Team not known at the time of the draw. Was the Path 3 Semifinal Loser in the EuroLeague Women qualification.)	26	32
(Czech Basketball Federation) KP Brno (Note: Team not known at the time of the draw. Was the Path 4 Semifinal Loser in the EuroLeague Women qualification.)	40	24
(Turkish Basketball Federation) ÇBK Mersin	3	200
(French Federation of Basketball) Villeneuve-d'Ascq LM	4	164
(Spanish Basketball Federation) Meins Avenida	12	84
(French Federation of Basketball) BLMA	15	64

Pot 2
Team	Rank	Points
(Turkish Basketball Federation) Beşiktaş	16	60
(Basketball Belgium) Castors Braine	26	32
(Hellenic Basketball Federation) Olympiacos SFP	26	32
(German Basketball Federation) Rutronik Stars Keltern	31	30
(Latvian Basketball Association) TTT Riga	31	30
(Polish Basketball Federation) KS AZS AJP Gorzów	40	24
(Spanish Basketball Federation) Hozono Global Jairis	45	20
(French Federation of Basketball) Charnay Basket	45	20
(Italian Basketball Federation) Magnolia Basket Campobasso	45	20
(Swiss Basketball) BCF Elfic Fribourg	45	20
(Basketball Belgium) Basket Namur Capitale	54	16
(Portuguese Basketball Federation) SL Benfica	54	16

Pot 3
Team	Rank	Points
(Polish Basketball Federation) Ślęza Wrocław	63	10
(Czech Basketball Federation) SBŠ Ostrava	69	8
(Romanian Basketball Federation) CS Universitatea Cluj	73	6
(Basketball Federation of Serbia) ŽKK Student Niš	73	6
(German Basketball Federation) Alba Berlin	77	4
(Swiss Basketball) Nyon Basket Feminin	77	4
(Slovak Basketball Association) MBK Ružomberok	77	4
(Czech Basketball Federation) DSK Basketball Brandýs	94	2
(Hellenic Basketball Federation) Panathlitikos Sykeon	94	2
(Spanish Basketball Federation) Durán Maquinaria Ensino	N/A	
(French Federation of Basketball) Landerneau Bretagne	N/A	
(Cyprus Basketball Federation) AEL Limassol	N/A	

Pot 4
Team	Rank	Points
(Italian Basketball Federation) BCC Derthona Basket	N/A	
(Hellenic Basketball Federation) Panserraikos	N/A	
(Israeli Basketball Association) Maccabi Bnot Ashdod	N/A	
(Croatian Basketball Federation) ŽKK Brod na Savi	N/A	
(Bulgarian Basketball Federation) WBC Montana 2003	N/A	
(Basketball Finland) Helsinki Basketball Academy	N/A	
(Basketball Federation of Slovenia) Cinkarna Celje	N/A	
(Spanish Basketball Federation) Baxi Ferrol (Note: Team not known at the time of the draw. Was the Play Off 1 Winner in EuroCup Women qualification.)	17	44
(French Federation of Basketball) Chartres Basket (Note: Team not known at the time of the draw. Was the Play Off 2 Winner in EuroCup Women qualification.)	N/A	
(Israeli Basketball Association) Elitzur Ramla (Note: Team not known at the time of the draw. Was the Play Off 3 Winner in EuroCup Women qualification.)	45	20
(German Basketball Federation) Saarlouis Royals (Note: Team not known at the time of the draw. Was the Play Off 4 Winner in EuroCup Women qualification.)	77	4
(Italian Basketball Federation) GEAS Basket (Note: Team not known at the time of the draw. Was the Play Off 5 Winner in EuroCup Women qualification.)	45	20

== Groups ==
=== Group A ===
Pos	Team	Pld	W	L	PF	PA	PD	Pts	Qualification	ZAB	CHA	AEL	HBA
1	(Czech Basketball Federation) Žabiny Brno	4	4	0	373	234	+139	8	Play-off Round 1	—		102–64	
2	(French Federation of Basketball) Charnay Basket	4	3	1	350	270	+80	7	Play-off Round 1	74–81	—		91–54
3	(Cyprus Basketball Federation) AEL Limassol	4	1	3	269	369	−100	5	Possible Play-off Round 1	37–95	80–93	—	88–79
4	(Basketball Finland) Helsinki Basketball Academy	4	0	4	247	366	−119	4		59–95	55–92		—

Updated to match(es) played on 4 November 2026. Source: EuroCup Women
Legend: Blue = home team win; Red = away team win.
Rules for classification: 1) Points; 2) Points difference; 3) Points scored.

=== Group B ===
Pos	Team	Pld	W	L	PF	PA	PD	Pts	Qualification	BES	VIL	MAC	DSK
1	(Turkish Basketball Federation) Beşiktaş	4	3	1	304	239	+65	7	Play-off Round 1	—	73–76	78–55	
2	(French Federation of Basketball) Villeneuve-d'Ascq LM	3	3	0	253	177	+76	6	Play-off Round 1		—		92–51
3	(Israeli Basketball Association) Maccabi Bnot Ashdod	4	2	2	243	223	+20	6	Possible Play-off Round 1	60–70		—	67–48
4	(Czech Basketball Federation) DSK Basketball Brandýs	5	0	5	227	388	−161	5		48–83	53–85	27–61	—

Updated to match(es) played on 4 November 2026. Source: EuroCup Women
Legend: Blue = home team win; Red = away team win.
Rules for classification: 1) Points; 2) Points difference; 3) Points scored.

=== Group C ===
Pos	Team	Pld	W	L	PF	PA	PD	Pts	Qualification	PAO	GEA	ALB	CAS
1	(Hellenic Basketball Federation) Panathinaikos AC	4	4	0	319	262	+57	8	Play-off Round 1	—		81–73	
2	(Italian Basketball Federation) GEAS Basket	4	2	2	292	285	+7	6	Play-off Round 1	65–75	—	72–54	80–78
3	(German Basketball Federation) Alba Berlin	4	1	3	260	300	−40	5	Possible Play-off Round 1	58–79		—	75–68
4	(Basketball Belgium) Castors Braine	4	1	3	290	314	−24	5		66–84	78–75		—

Updated to match(es) played on 4 November 2026. Source: EuroCup Women
Legend: Blue = home team win; Red = away team win.
Rules for classification: 1) Points; 2) Points difference; 3) Points scored.

=== Group D ===
Pos	Team	Pld	W	L	PF	PA	PD	Pts	Qualification	CBK	OLY	BAX	SLE
1	(Turkish Basketball Federation) ÇBK Mersin	4	4	0	346	233	+113	8	Play-off Round 1	—			72–59
2	(Hellenic Basketball Federation) Olympiacos SFP	4	3	1	313	283	+30	7	Play-off Round 1	62–89	—	96–68	
3	(Spanish Basketball Federation) Baxi Ferrol	4	1	3	255	323	−68	5	Possible Play-off Round 1	42–85	58–77	—	
4	(Polish Basketball Federation) Ślęza Wrocław	4	0	4	262	337	−75	4		70–100	68–78	65–87	—

Updated to match(es) played on 4 November 2026. Source: EuroCup Women
Legend: Blue = home team win; Red = away team win.
Rules for classification: 1) Points; 2) Points difference; 3) Points scored.

=== Group E ===
Pos	Team	Pld	W	L	PF	PA	PD	Pts	Qualification	JAI	DVTK	PAN	BRO
1	(Spanish Basketball Federation) Hozono Global Jairis	4	4	0	375	197	+178	8	Play-off Round 1	—	89–48	98–51	79–44
2	(Hungarian Basketball Federation) DVTK HUN-Therm	4	3	1	270	257	+13	7	Play-off Round 1		—	56–38	
3	(Hellenic Basketball Federation) Panathlitikos Sykeon	4	1	3	242	294	−52	5	Possible Play-off Round 1		74–77	—	79–63
4	(Croatian Basketball Federation) ŽKK Brod na Savi	4	0	4	217	356	−139	4		54–109	56–89		—

Updated to match(es) played on 4 November 2026. Source: EuroCup Women
Legend: Blue = home team win; Red = away team win.
Rules for classification: 1) Points; 2) Points difference; 3) Points scored.

=== Group F ===
Pos	Team	Pld	W	L	PF	PA	PD	Pts	Qualification	REY	RAM	TTT	UNI
1	(Italian Basketball Federation) Umana Reyer Venezia	5	4	1	441	293	+148	9	Play-off Round 1	—	64–67	43–96	111–47
2	(Israeli Basketball Association) Elitzur Ramla	4	2	2	288	299	−11	6	Play-off Round 1	64–79	—	75–80	
3	(Latvian Basketball Association) TTT Riga	4	2	2	312	310	+2	6	Possible Play-off Round 1	72–91	76–82	—	
4	(Romanian Basketball Federation) CS Universitatea Cluj	3	0	3	152	291	−139	3				62–84	—

Updated to match(es) played on 4 November 2026. Source: EuroCup Women
Legend: Blue = home team win; Red = away team win.
Rules for classification: 1) Points; 2) Points difference; 3) Points scored.

=== Group G ===
Pos	Team	Pld	W	L	PF	PA	PD	Pts	Qualification	MAG	NYO	CEL	BRN
1	(Italian Basketball Federation) Magnolia Basket Campobasso	4	3	1	311	233	+78	7	Play-off Round 1	—		75–53	100–58
2	(Swiss Basketball) Nyon Basket Feminin	4	2	2	261	281	−20	6	Play-off Round 1	59–77	—	63–57	79–75
3	(Basketball Federation of Slovenia) Cinkarna Celje	4	2	2	265	259	+6	6	Possible Play-off Round 1	63–59		—	92–62
4	(Czech Basketball Federation) KP Brno	4	1	3	267	331	−64	5			72–60		—

Updated to match(es) played on 4 November 2026. Source: EuroCup Women
Legend: Blue = home team win; Red = away team win.
Rules for classification: 1) Points; 2) Points difference; 3) Points scored.

=== Group H ===
Pos	Team	Pld	W	L	PF	PA	PD	Pts	Qualification	DER	POZ	LAN	FRI
1	(Italian Basketball Federation) BCC Derthona Basket	4	4	0	299	253	+46	8	Play-off Round 1	—	73–64		82–61
2	(Polish Basketball Federation) AZS Poznań	4	3	1	304	289	+15	7	Play-off Round 1		—	77–65	
3	(French Federation of Basketball) Landerneau Bretagne	4	1	3	292	289	+3	5	Possible Play-off Round 1	68–73	71–76	—	83–63
4	(Swiss Basketball) BCF Elfic Fribourg	4	0	4	264	328	−64	4		60–71	80–87		—

Updated to match(es) played on 4 November 2026. Source: EuroCup Women
Legend: Blue = home team win; Red = away team win.
Rules for classification: 1) Points; 2) Points difference; 3) Points scored.

=== Group I ===
Pos	Team	Pld	W	L	PF	PA	PD	Pts	Qualification	BEN	SOP	SAA	STU
1	(Portuguese Basketball Federation) SL Benfica	4	4	0	284	254	+30	8	Play-off Round 1	—	72–62	69–65	
2	(Hungarian Basketball Federation) Sopron Basket	4	3	1	312	264	+48	7	Play-off Round 1		—		89–71
3	(German Basketball Federation) Saarlouis Royals	4	1	3	247	288	−41	5	Possible Play-off Round 1	52–61	46–83	—	
4	(Basketball Federation of Serbia) ŽKK Student Niš	4	0	4	296	333	−37	4		75–82	75–78	75–84	—

Updated to match(es) played on 4 November 2026. Source: EuroCup Women
Legend: Blue = home team win; Red = away team win.
Rules for classification: 1) Points; 2) Points difference; 3) Points scored.

=== Group J ===
Pos	Team	Pld	W	L	PF	PA	PD	Pts	Qualification	GOR	BLMA	ENS	PAN
1	(Polish Basketball Federation) KS AZS AJP Gorzów	4	4	0	359	290	+69	8	Play-off Round 1	—	77–65		87–63
2	(French Federation of Basketball) BLMA	4	2	2	330	304	+26	6	Play-off Round 1		—	89–64	
3	(Spanish Basketball Federation) Durán Maquinaria Ensino	4	2	2	313	332	−19	6	Possible Play-off Round 1	83–105	86–80	—	80–58
4	(Hellenic Basketball Federation) Panserraikos	4	0	4	277	353	−76	4		79–90	77–96		—

Updated to match(es) played on 4 November 2026. Source: EuroCup Women
Legend: Blue = home team win; Red = away team win.
Rules for classification: 1) Points; 2) Points difference; 3) Points scored.

=== Group K ===
Pos	Team	Pld	W	L	PF	PA	PD	Pts	Qualification	MON	GIR	OST	RUT
1	(Bulgarian Basketball Federation) WBC Montana 2003	4	3	1	294	254	+40	7	Play-off Round 1	—	82–73		73–66
2	(Spanish Basketball Federation) Spar Girona	4	3	1	306	244	+62	7	Play-off Round 1		—	77–49	
3	(Czech Basketball Federation) SBŠ Ostrava	4	1	3	240	322	−82	5	Possible Play-off Round 1	49–79	58–86	—	
4	(German Basketball Federation) Rutronik Stars Keltern	4	1	3	267	287	−20	5		66–60		80–84	—

Updated to match(es) played on 4 November 2026. Source: EuroCup Women
Legend: Blue = home team win; Red = away team win.
Rules for classification: 1) Points; 2) Points difference; 3) Points scored.

=== Group L ===
Pos	Team	Pld	W	L	PF	PA	PD	Pts	Qualification	CHA	AVE	NAM	RUZ
1	(French Federation of Basketball) Chartres Basket	4	3	1	327	312	+15	7	Play-off Round 1	—	102–101	83–72	
2	(Spanish Basketball Federation) Meins Avenida	4	3	1	341	270	+71	7	Play-off Round 1		—		75–64
3	(Basketball Belgium) Basket Namur Capitale	4	1	3	258	305	−47	5	Possible Play-off Round 1	60–70	55–87	—	
4	(Slovak Basketball Association) MBK Ružomberok	4	1	3	257	296	−39	5		79–72	49–78	65–71	—

Updated to match(es) played on 4 November 2026. Source: EuroCup Women
Legend: Blue = home team win; Red = away team win.
Rules for classification: 1) Points; 2) Points difference; 3) Points scored.

== See also ==
- 2026–27 EuroLeague Women
- 2026–27 EuroCup Women
- 2026 FIBA Europe SuperCup Women
- 2026–27 EuroLeague Women regular season
- 2026–27 EuroLeague Women qualification round
- 2026–27 EuroCup Women qualification round
- 2026–27 EuroCup Basketball
