= 2026–27 EuroCup Women qualification round =

EuroCup Women qualification round
- Season: 2026–27
- Dates: 24 September – 1 October 2026
- Games played: 10
- Teams: 10 (from 9 countries)

The 2026–27 EuroCup Women qualification round decided the final five teams in the regular season.

== Format ==
Ten teams were divided into five play offs, where the winners on aggregate advanced to the regular season.

== Teams ==
Location of teams of the 2026–27 EuroCup Women qualification round. Orange: Play Off 1; Green: Play Off 2; Brown: Play Off 3; Blue: Play Off 4; Yellow: Play Off 5.

Teams
(Bulgarian Basketball Federation) Beroe Stara Zagora
(Czech Basketball Federation) Levhartice Chomutov
(French Federation of Basketball) Chartres Basket
(German Basketball Federation) Saarlouis Royals
(Hellenic Basketball Federation) Proteas Voulas
(Italian Basketball Federation) GEAS Basket
(Israeli Basketball Association) Elitzur Ramla
(Spanish Basketball Federation) Baxi Ferrol
(Spanish Basketball Federation) Impulso 360 Estepona
(Swiss Basketball) Ravens de Geneve

== Draw ==
External videos
- Draw

The draw took place at 11:00 CET in Munich, Germany on 16 July 2026. The bold text means which teams advanced.

Key to colours
Teams advancing to the **Regular season**

Pot 1
Team	Rank	Points
(Spanish Basketball Federation) Baxi Ferrol	17	44
(Israeli Basketball Association) Elitzur Ramla	45	20
(Italian Basketball Federation) GEAS Basket	45	20
(Czech Basketball Federation) Levhartice Chomutov	57	14
(German Basketball Federation) Saarlouis Royals	77	4

Pot 2
Team	Rank	Points
(Bulgarian Basketball Federation) Beroe Stara Zagora	77	4
(Hellenic Basketball Federation) Proteas Voulas	77	4
(French Federation of Basketball) Chartres Basket	N/A	
(Spanish Basketball Federation) Impulso 360 Estepona	N/A	
(Swiss Basketball) Ravens de Geneve	N/A	

== Matches ==
The winners on aggregate advanced to the regular season.

Team 1	Agg.	Team 2	1st leg	2nd leg
**Baxi Ferrol** (Spain)	**161**–119	(Bulgaria) Beroe Stara Zagora	76–61	85–58
Levhartice Chomutov (Czech Republic)	111–**167**	(France) **Chartres Basket**	66–80	45–87
**Elitzur Ramla** (Israel)	**167**–102	(Greece) Proteas Voulas	79–46	88–56
**Saarlouis Royals** (Germany)	**186**–131	(Switzerland) Ravens de Geneve	109–75	77–56
**GEAS Basket** (Italy)	**152**–136	(Spain) Impulso 360 Estepona	76–65	76–71

All times are local.

24 September 2026
18:00 (EEST)

Boxscore

Beroe Stara Zagora (Bulgarian Basketball Federation)	61–**76**	(Spanish Basketball Federation) **Baxi Ferrol**
Scoring by quarter: 9–**23**, **26**–14, 11–**22**, 15–**17**
Pts: Stoyanovska 16; Rebs: Kucowski 11; Asts: Katanić 6		Pts: Doogan 20; Rebs: Belošević 8 Asts: Melia 7

Obshtinska, Stara Zagora
Attendance: 320
Referees: Özlem Yalman (TUR), Luka Manojlović (SRB), Ori Shalhavi (ISR)

1 October 2026
20:15 (CEST)

Boxscore

**Baxi Ferrol** (Spanish Basketball Federation)	**85**–58	(Bulgarian Basketball Federation) Beroe Stara Zagora
Scoring by quarter: **23**–17, **19**–13, **21**–17, **22**–11
Pts: Galíčková 15; Rebs: Melia 8 Asts: Melia 7		Pts: Stoyanovska 30; Rebs: Kucowski 12; Asts: Katanić 7

Polideportivo A Malata, Ferrol
Attendance: 964
Referees: Laure Coanus (FRA), Diogo Martins (POR), Yoann Buttet (SUI)

Baxi Ferrol won 161–119 on aggregate

24 September 2026
20:00 (CEST)

Boxscore

**Chartres Basket** (French Federation of Basketball)	**80**–66	(Czech Basketball Federation) Levhartice Chomutov
Scoring by quarter: **29**–23, 14–**17**, 15–**17**, **22**–9
Pts: Koné 18; Rebs: Bailey 10; Asts: Legrand 6		Pts: Striplin 14; Rebs: Heide 10; Asts: Moore-McNeil 8

Le Colisée, Chalon-sur-Saône
Attendance: 1,700
Referees: Chess Van Looy (BEL), Andrea Valzani (ITA), Kenny Jeanmonod (SUI)

1 October 2026
19:00 (CEST)

Boxscore

Levhartice Chomutov (Czech Basketball Federation)	45–**87**	(French Federation of Basketball) **Chartres Basket**
Scoring by quarter: 11–**28**, 9–**20**, 9–**24**, **17**–15
Pts: Moore-McNeil 12; Rebs: Heide 6 Asts: three players 2		Pts: Mavambou 18; Rebs: Nicholson 8 Asts: four players 4

Městská sportovní hala Chomutov, Chomutov
Attendance: Igor Esteve Malmierca (AND), Maximilian Meiler (GER), Giacomo Dori (ITA)
Referees: 357

Chartres Basket won 167–111 on aggregate

23 September 2026
20:30 (EEST)

Boxscore

Proteas Voulas (Hellenic Basketball Federation)	46–**79**	(Israeli Basketball Association) **Elitzur Ramla**
Scoring by quarter: 10–**25**, 12–**22**, 14–**15**, 10–**17**
Pts: Perry 12; Rebs: Grigoropoulou 9 Asts: Poindexter, Núñez 4		Pts: three players 14; Rebs: Herbert Harrigan 8 Asts: Eisner 9

Sofia Befon Palaio Faliro Indoor Hall, Palaio Faliro
Attendance: 100
Referees: Sandra Sánchez (ESP), Pawel Pacek (POL), Nika Štampalija (CRO)

25 September 2026
20:30 (EEST)

Boxscore

**Elitzur Ramla** (Israeli Basketball Association)	**88**–56	(Hellenic Basketball Federation) Proteas Voulas
Scoring by quarter: **32**–12, **17**–14, **20**–14, **19**–16
Pts: Raber 20; Rebs: three players 7 Asts: Eisner 9		Pts: Poindexter 19; Rebs: Núñez 6 Asts: Andrikopoulou 4

Sofia Befon Palaio Faliro Indoor Hall, Palaio Faliro
Attendance: 65
Referees: Ivana Ivanaović (SRB), Bogna Podkowińska (POL), Romana Stojanović (CRO)

Elitzur Ramla won 167–102 on aggregate

24 September 2026
19:30 (CEST)

Boxscore

Ravens de Geneve (Swiss Basketball)	75–**109**	(German Basketball Federation) **Saarlouis Royals**
Scoring by quarter: 11–**27**, 22–**30**, 24–**34**, 18–18
Pts: Walsh 28; Rebs: Walsh 6 Asts: Defosset 10		Pts: Squires 22; Rebs: Koskimies, Eichmeyer 8 Asts: Koskimies, Eichmeyer6

Centre sportif du Bout-du-Monde, Geneva
Attendance: 397
Referees: Ilias Karpanos (GRE), Laure Coanus (FRA), Irene Frosolini (ITA)

1 October 2026
19:00 (CEST)

Boxscore

**Saarlouis Royals** (German Basketball Federation)	**77**–56	(Swiss Basketball) Ravens de Geneve
Scoring by quarter: **22**–8, **21**–18, **24**–14, 10–**16**
Pts: Koskimies 21; Rebs: Hill 8 Asts: Eichmeyer 6		Pts: Walsh 12; Rebs: Walsh 6 Asts: Defosset 3

Stadtgartenhalle Saarlouis, Saarlouis
Attendance: 650
Referees: Nemanja Vlahović (SRB), Veronika Vávrová (CZE), Oleksandr Dotsenko (LUX)

Saarlouis Royals won 186–131 on aggregate

24 September 2026
20:00 (CEST)

Boxscore

Impulso 360 Estepona (Spanish Basketball Federation)	65–**76**	(Italian Basketball Federation) **GEAS Basket**
Scoring by quarter: 25–25, 13–**16**, **16**–13, 11–**22**
Pts: Watts 15; Rebs: Gretter, Rodríguez 5 Asts: Gretter 4		Pts: White 22; Rebs: Okosun 8 Asts: Cornelius 8

Pabellón J.A Pineda, Estepona
Attendance: 752
Referees: Jan Baloun (CZE), Jemina Sofia Vahakytta (FIN), Georgios Martinakos (GRE)

30 September 2026
19:30 (CEST)

Boxscore

**GEAS Basket** (Italian Basketball Federation)	**76**–71	(Spanish Basketball Federation) Impulso 360 Estepona
Scoring by quarter: **25**–16, **17**–14, 14–**24**, **20**–17
Pts: White 25; Rebs: Okosun 9 Asts: Cornelius 4		Pts: Watts 15; Rebs: Muhate 4 Asts: Gervasini, Gretter 5

PalaAllende, Milan
Attendance: 500
Referees: Aurimas Borušas (LTU), Martin Demierre (SUI), Nikolett Gruber (HUN)

GEAS Basket won 152–136 on aggregate

== See also ==
- 2026–27 EuroLeague Women
- 2026–27 EuroLeague Women regular season
- 2026–27 EuroCup Women
- 2026–27 EuroCup Women regular season
- 2026–27 EuroCup Women knockout stage
- 2026 FIBA Europe SuperCup Women
- 2026–27 EuroLeague Women qualification round

Reference
First leg
