= 2025–26 Ligue Féminine de Basketball =

Women's basketball league in France

Ligue Féminine de Basketball
- Season: 2025–26
- Dates: Regular season: September 2025 – April 2026; Play Offs: April – May 2026
- Games played: 132 (Regular season); 15 (Play offs); 12 (Playdowns)
- Teams: 12

Regular season
- Relegated: Roche Vendee

Finals
- Champions: Basket Landes (3rd title)
- Runners-up: Tango Bourges Basket
- Finals MVP: (France) Leïla Lacan

Statistical leaders
Points	(United States) Stella Johnson	17.1
Rebounds	(United States) Cierra Burdick	10.7
Assists	(France) Coline Franchelin	7.9
Steals	(United States) Jasmine Bailey	3.0
Blocks	(United States) Nukiya Mayo	1.3
Efficiency	(United States) Jasmine Bailey	18.2

The 2025–26 Ligue Féminine de Basketball (or the 2025–26 La Boulangère Wonderligue for sponsorship reasons) was the 98th season of the top division women's basketball league in France, and the 27th edition since the creation of the LFB. It started in September 2025 with the first round of the regular season and ended in April 2026.

Basket Landes are the defending champions.

== Format ==
Each team plays each other twice. The top eight teams qualify for the play offs, where the quarterfinals and semifinals are held as a two legged aggregate tie while the final is played as a best of three series. The teams who don't reach the play offs advance to the play outs where one team will be relegated.

== Teams ==
=== Promotion and relegation (pre-season) ===
A total of 12 teams contest the league, including 11 sides from the 2024–25 season and one promoted from the 2024–25 Ligue 2.

On 7 May 2025, Chartres Basket were relegated after losing to Roche Vendee, thus securing an immediate return to Ligue 2. On 17 May 2025, Toulouse Métropole Basket were promoted to the top division after beating Montbrison in the final. They will take part in the top division after a three year absence. Chartres Basket was later reprieved of relegation due to the voluntary relegation and later liquidation of Tarbes Gespe Bigorre

▲ Promoted from Ligue 2	▼ Relegated to Ligue 2
Toulouse Métropole Basket	Tarbes Gespe Bigorre

=== Venues and locations ===
Location of teams within France

Team	City	Arena	Capacity	Colours
Angers 49	Angers	Salle Jean Bouin	3,000	
Basket Landes	Mont-de-Marsan	Salle Francois Mitterrand	3,000	
Tango Bourges Basket	Bourges	Palais des Sports du Prado	3,100	
Flammes Carolo Basket	Charleville-Mézières	L'Arena	2,960	
Charnay Basket	Charnay-lès-Mâcon	The Cosec	700	
Landerneau Bretagne Basket	Landerneau	La Cimenterie	2,300	
Lattes Montpellier	Lattes	Palais des sports de Lattes	1,100	
ASVEL Féminin	Lyon	Gymnase Mado Bonnet	1,500	
Roche Vendee	La Roche-sur-Yon	Salle des Oudairies	2,500	
Tarbes GB	Tarbes	Palais des Sports de l'Adour	1,800	
Toulouse Métropole Basket	Toulouse	Gymnase Compans Cafarelli	1,900	
Villeneuve d'Ascq	Villeneuve-d'Ascq	Le Palacium	1,800	

== League standings ==
Pos	Team	Pld	W	L	PF	PA	PD	Pts	Qualification
1	Basket Landes	22	19	3	1584	1333	+251	41	Play Offs
2	Tango Bourges Basket	22	17	5	1631	1438	+193	39	Play Offs
3	Flammes Carolo Basket	22	15	7	1692	1443	+249	37	Play Offs
4	Landerneau Bretagne Basket	22	14	8	1515	1500	+15	36	Play Offs
5	Lattes Montpellier	22	13	9	1605	1529	+76	35	Play Offs
6	Villeneuve d'Ascq	22	11	11	1574	1585	−11	33	Play Offs
7	Charnay Basket	22	11	11	1597	1661	−64	33	Play Offs
8	Chartres Basket	22	7	15	1549	1704	−155	29	Play Offs
9	Roche Vendee	22	7	15	1545	1647	−102	29	Play Outs
10	ASVEL Féminin	22	7	15	1554	1584	−30	29	Play Outs
11	Toulouse Métropole Basket	22	6	16	1471	1699	−228	28	Play Outs
12	Angers 49	22	5	17	1403	1597	−194	27	Play Outs

Source: Standings
Rules for classification: 1) Points; 2) Points difference; 3) Points scored.

== Results ==
Home \ Away	ANG	ASV	LAN	CHA	FLA	LBB	BLM	ROC	TAN	TAR	TOU	VIL
Angers 49	—	62–60	75–73	84–91	–	–	–	–	–	–	78–60	69–79
ASVEL Féminin	–	—	–	64–69	70–84	86–79	–	–	–	78–64	76–72	–
Basket Landes	–	–	—	68–46	75–67	59–43	–	72–47	–	–	77–57	–
Charnay Basket	–	–	–	—	78–77	–	50–68	79–71	66–73	89–74	–	–
Flammes Carolo Basket	78–47	–	–	–	—	–	70–71	72–67	77–62	83–67	–	–
Landerneau Bretagne Basket	75–67	–	–	–	85–81	—	72–68	70–69	–	67–60	–	–
Lattes Montpellier	79–76	73–64	75–76	–	–	–	—	–	72–59	–	–	75–70
Roche Vendee	64–72	70–66	–	–	–	–	74–73	—	–	–	–	70–73
Tango Bourges Basket	–	71–63	53–58	–	–	82–68	–	77–59	—	–	86–63	–
Tarbes GB	89–78	–	58–77	–	–	–	76–73	–	58–62	—	–	60–78
Toulouse Métropole Basket	–	–	–	57–90	49–73	64–78	–	66–65	–	83–88	—	–
Villeneuve d'Ascq	–	65–92	77–72	85–70	–	75–67	–	–	69–50	–	–	—

Updated to match(es) played on 14 December 2025. Source: Results
Legend: Blue = home team win; Red = away team win.
For upcoming matches, an "a" indicates there is an article about the rivalry between the two participants.

== Play offs ==
Quarterfinals
1	Basket Landes	97	84	181
8	Chartres Basket	82	47	129
4	Landerneau Bretagne Basket	66	70	136
5	Lattes Montpellier	73	64	137
2	Tango Bourges Basket	81	93	174
7	Charnay Basket	79	62	141
3	Flammes Carolo Basket	56	104	160
6	Villeneuve d'Ascq	82	77	159

Semifinals
1	Basket Landes	60	81	141
5	Lattes Montpellier	57	80	137
2	Tango Bourges Basket	80	61	141
3	Flammes Carolo Basket	67	69	136

Final
1	Basket Landes	49	59	53
2	Tango Bourges Basket	67	54	50

Champions of France

Basket Landes
3rd title

== Playdowns ==
Pos	Team	Pld	W	L	PF	PA	PD	Pts	Qualification	ASV	ANG	TOU	ROC
9	ASVEL Féminin	12	9	3	905	754	+151	21 (Note: ASVEL Féminin was deducted 1 point.)		—	77–56	81–48	72–53
10	Angers 49	12	6	6	838	809	+29	18		58–73	—	60–67	88–67
11	Toulouse Métropole Basket	12	6	6	804	861	−57	18		68–75	69–93	—	75–62
12	Roche Vendee	12	3	9	798	921	−123	15	Relegation to 2026–27 Ligue 2 Feminin	61–88	72–84	62–77	—

Source: Ligue Féminine de Basketball
Legend: Blue = home team win; Red = away team win.
Rules for classification: 1) Points; 2) Points difference; 3) Points scored.
