= 2026–27 EuroLeague Women qualification round =

EuroLeague Women qualification round
- Season: 2026–27
- Dates: September 23–30, 2026
- Games played: 10
- Teams: 12 (from 10 countries)

The 2026–27 EuroLeague Women qualification round was a series of European women's basketball matches that decided the final four clubs in the regular season.

== Format ==
Twelve teams were divided into four single-elimination qualifying brackets. In each bracket, the seed 2 and seed 3 teams met in the semi-finals, with the winner advancing to face the seed 1 team in the final. The winner of each bracket qualified for the EuroLeague Women regular season, while the remaining clubs entered the EuroCup Women regular season.

Twelve teams were divided into four play offs, where the winners on aggregate advanced to the regular season.

== Teams ==
Location of teams of the 2026–27 EuroLeague Women qualification round. Orange: Path 1; Green: Path 2; Brown: Path 3; Blue: Path 4.

Country	Club
Czech Republic	Žabiny Brno
Czech Republic	KP Brno
France	Flammes Carolo Basket
Greece	Panathinaikos AC
Hungary	DVTK HUN-Therm
Hungary	Sopron Basket
Italy	Umana Reyer Venezia
Lithuania	Kibirkštis-TOKS
Poland	AZS Poznań
Serbia	KKZ Crvena zvezda
Spain	Spar Girona
Turkey	Emlak Konut

== Draw ==
External videos
- Draw

The draw took place at 11:00 CET in Munich, Germany on 16 July 2026. The teams in bold advanced.

Key to colours
Teams advancing to the **Regular season**

Pot 1
Team	Rank	Points
(Spanish Basketball Federation) Spar Girona	9	104
(Italian Basketball Federation) Umana Reyer Venezia	11	93
(Hungarian Basketball Federation) DVTK HUN-Therm	14	74
(Hungarian Basketball Federation) Sopron Basket	21	38

Pot 2
Team	Rank	Points
(Czech Basketball Federation) Žabiny Brno	21	38
(Hellenic Basketball Federation) Panathinaikos AC	26	32
(Lithuanian Basketball Federation) Kibirkštis-TOKS	31	30
(French Federation of Basketball) Flammes Carolo Basket	36	28

Pot 3
Team	Rank	Points
(Czech Basketball Federation) KP Brno	40	24
(Basketball Federation of Serbia) KKZ Crvena zvezda	45	20
(Turkish Basketball Federation) Emlak Konut	57	14
(Polish Basketball Federation) AZS Poznań	N/A	

== Matches ==
=== Path 1 ===
Semifinal			Final
			1	(Hungarian Basketball Federation) Sopron Basket	62
**2**	**(Lithuanian Basketball Federation) Kibirkštis-TOKS**	**91**	**2**	**(Lithuanian Basketball Federation) Kibirkštis-TOKS**	**81**
3	(Polish Basketball Federation) AZS Poznań	69

==== Semifinal ====
23 September 2026
19:00 (EEST)

Boxscore

**Kibirkštis-TOKS** (Lithuanian Basketball Federation)	**91**–69	(Polish Basketball Federation) AZS Poznań
Scoring by quarter: **30**–20, 19–**20**, **20**–11, **22**–18
Pts: Wadoux 21; Rebs: Becker 9 Asts: Woolfolk 11		Pts: Fitzgerald 22; Rebs: Miškinienė 11; Asts: Popović 4

Active Vilnius Arena, Vilnius
Attendance: 1,189
Referees: Veronika Obertová (SVK), Sara Månsson (SWE), Hendrik Laas (EST)

==== Final ====
30 September 2026
18:00 (CEST)

Boxscore

Sopron Basket (Hungarian Basketball Federation)	62–**81**	(Lithuanian Basketball Federation) **Kibirkštis-TOKS**
Scoring by quarter: 16–**20**, 12–**17**, **19**–17, 15–**27**
Pts: Janković 16; Rebs: Todd-Williams 13; Asts: Friškovec, Todd-Williams 4		Pts: Wadoux 27; Rebs: Ūsė 9 Asts: Becker 3

Arena Sopron, Sopron
Attendance: 550
Referees: Jelena Tomić (CRO), Svetlana Stoyanova (BUL), Romana Rea Car (AUT)

=== Path 2 ===
Semifinal			Final
			1	(Hungarian Basketball Federation) DVTK HUN-Therm	66
2	(Czech Basketball Federation) Žabiny Brno	69	**3**	**(Basketball Federation of Serbia) KKZ Crvena zvezda**	**71**
**3**	**(Basketball Federation of Serbia) KKZ Crvena zvezda**	**75**

==== Semifinal ====
23 September 2026
18:00 (CEST)

Boxscore

Žabiny Brno (Czech Basketball Federation)	69–**75**	(Basketball Federation of Serbia) **KKZ Crvena zvezda**
Scoring by quarter: **24**–20, 14–**18**, **19**–17, 12–**20**
Pts: Stoupalová 15; Rebs: Giomi 12; Asts: Joklová, Ryan 4		Pts: Henderson 18; Rebs: Spanou 11; Asts: Henderson 8

Sportovní hala Vodova, Brno
Attendance: 1,238
Referees: Milita Stalauncinskaitė (LTU), Alessandro Perciavalle (ITA), Romana Rea Car (AUT)

==== Final ====
30 September 2026
18:00 (CEST)

Boxscore

DVTK HUN-Therm (Hungarian Basketball Federation)	66–**71**	(Basketball Federation of Serbia) **KKZ Crvena zvezda**
Scoring by quarter: 17–**18**, **19**–12, 17–**25**, 13–**16**
Pts: Kányási 12; Rebs: Balayera 8 Asts: Aho 8		Pts: Collier, Henderson 18; Rebs: Spanou 12; Asts: Katanić, Sujić 3

DVTK Arena, Miskolc
Attendance: 1,700
Referees: Veronika Obertová (SVK), Sara Månsson (SWE), Amalia Marchiş (ROU)

=== Path 3 ===
Semifinal			Final
			1	(Spanish Basketball Federation) Spar Girona	69
2	(Hellenic Basketball Federation) Panathinaikos AC	68	**3**	**(Turkish Basketball Federation) Emlak Konut**	**81**
**3**	**(Turkish Basketball Federation) Emlak Konut**	**91**

==== Semifinal ====
23 September 2026
21:30 (EEST)

Boxscore

Panathinaikos AC (Hellenic Basketball Federation)	68–**91**	(Turkish Basketball Federation) **Emlak Konut**
Scoring by quarter: 3–**26**, 18–**32**, **20**–17, **27**–16
Pts: Formann, Prince 12; Rebs: Krimili 5 Asts: Carter 4		Pts: Kunaiyi-Akpannah, Mavunga 19; Rebs: Lelik 9 Asts: Lelik 10

Cholargos Sports Hall, Athens
Attendance: 1,000
Referees: Ivana Ivanović (SRB), Bogna Podkowińska (POL), Romana Stojanović (CRO)

==== Final ====
30 September 2026
20:15 (CEST)

Boxscore

Spar Girona (Spanish Basketball Federation)	69–**81**	(Turkish Basketball Federation) **Emlak Konut**
Scoring by quarter: 16–**19**, 20–20, 10–**26**, **23**–16
Pts: Bulgak 16; Rebs: Quevedo, Bulgak 7 Asts: Martín 9		Pts: Lelik 29; Rebs: Kunaiyi-Akpannah, Mavunga 12; Asts: Allen 8

Pavelló Fontajau, Girona
Attendance: 3,207
Referees: Nataša Dragojević (MNE), Ewa Matuszewska (POL), Alessandro Perciavalle (ITA)

=== Path 4 ===
Semifinal			Final
			1	(Italian Basketball Federation) Umana Reyer Venezia	55
**2**	**(French Federation of Basketball) Flammes Carolo Basket**	**101**	**2**	**(French Federation of Basketball) Flammes Carolo Basket**	**81**
3	(Czech Basketball Federation) KP Brno	81

==== Semifinal ====
23 September 2026
19:00 (CEST)

Boxscore

**Flammes Carolo Basket** (French Federation of Basketball)	**101**–81	(Czech Basketball Federation) KP Brno
Scoring by quarter: 22–22, **25**–16, **32**–22, **22**–21
Pts: Clarke 21; Rebs: Love 10; Asts: Franchelin, Pospisilova 8		Pts: Puckett 30; Rebs: Puckett 8 Asts: Zílova 5

Guinguette Arena, Charleville-Mézières
Attendance: 1,800
Referees: Esperanza Mendoza (ESP), Martin Van Hoye (BEL), Diogo Martins (POR)

==== Final ====
30 September 2026
19:30 (CEST)

Boxscore

Umana Reyer Venezia (Italian Basketball Federation)	55–**81**	(French Federation of Basketball) **Flammes Carolo Basket**
Scoring by quarter: **20**–16, 7–**23**, 9–**21**, 19–**21**
Pts: Pasa 12; Rebs: Ustby 7 Asts: Villa 4		Pts: Franchelin 16; Rebs: Brochant 8 Asts: Franchelin 6

Palasport Taliercio, Venice
Attendance: 1,536
Referees: Özlem Yalman (TUR), Nemanja Ninković (SRB), Goran Grbić (SLO)

== See also ==
- 2026–27 EuroLeague Women
- 2026–27 EuroLeague Women regular season
- 2026–27 EuroCup Women
- 2026–27 EuroCup Women regular season
- 2026–27 EuroCup Women knockout stage
- 2026 FIBA Europe SuperCup Women
- 2026–27 EuroCup Women qualification round

Reference
Semifinals
Final
