= 2026–27 EuroLeague Women =

EuroLeague Women
- Season: 2026–27
- Dates: Qualifying: 23–30 September 2026; Regular season: 14 October 2026 – 2 February 2027; Play-Ins: 24 February – 10 March 2027; Final Six: 14–18 April 2027
- Teams: Competition proper: 16; Total: 24 (from 12 countries)

The 2026–27 EuroLeague Women is the 69th edition of the premier European women's club basketball championship organized by FIBA, and the 30th edition since being rebranded from the FIBA Women's European Champions Cup to the EuroLeague Women. The season began on 23 September 2026 and will end on 18 April 2027 with the Final Six.

This edition is the third straight season under the current format.

The winners of EuroLeague Women automatically qualify for next season's edition and also qualify for the 2027 SuperCup.

Fenerbahçe are the defending champions, having won their third title previous season.

== Format ==
- Regular season (First round)

After the qualifiers, 16 teams are split into 4 groups of four, where the top three from each group advance to the second round. The fourth-place teams drop down to the EuroCup Women knockout stage. The advancing teams' records from the first round are carried over into the next round.

- Regular season (Second round)

The 12 remaining teams form 2 groups of six and will play the teams they have not played in the first round. In both groups, the top 2 will play the Semi-Final play-ins while 3rd and 4th play the Quarter-Final play-ins. The teams who finish fifth and sixth are eliminated.

- Play-ins

The play-ins will decide who makes the final six and where each team will start in the final six. The top 2 play the Semi-Final play-ins and the third and fourth teams play the Quarter-Final play-ins. Unlike last season, the play-ins are played as a best of three series, rather than a home and away aggregate format. The higher-seeded teams play the second leg at home.

The winners of the Semi-Final play-ins will automatically progress to the semifinals of the final six, while the victors of the Quarter-Final play-ins will reach the quarterfinals of the final six. The losers of the Quarter-Final play-ins are eliminated.

- Final Six

The final six is held in a centralised venue and decides the champion. The losers of the Semi-Final play-ins plus the winners of the Quarter-Final play-ins contest the quarterfinals. The two winners move on to the semifinals to play the teams who automatically qualify for this round. Whoever triumphs in the semifinals reach the final while the losers play the third place match.

== Rankings ==
The results were based on the results of the past three seasons.

- Associations 1–4 can have three teams qualify.
- Associations 5–8 each have two teams qualify.
- Associations 9–10 each have one team qualify directly into the regular season.
- Associations below the top 10 can have one team qualify for the qualification round.

If a club that qualified for the regular season doesn't take that place, it will be given to another club who entered.

Rank	Association	Average points	Teams
1	(Turkish Basketball Federation) Turkey	262.00	3
2	(Spanish Basketball Federation) Spain	201.67	3
3	(French Federation of Basketball) France	184.00	3
4	(Czech Basketball Federation) Czech Republic	109.67	3
5	(Italian Basketball Federation) Italy	106.67	2
6	(Hungarian Basketball Federation) Hungary	66.00	2
7	(Polish Basketball Federation) Poland	51.33	2
8	(Hellenic Basketball Federation) Greece	34.67	2
9	(Basketball Belgium) Belgium	25.33	1
10	(Romanian Basketball Federation) Romania	18.67	1
11	(British Basketball) Great Britain	17.33	0
12	(Lithuanian Basketball Federation) Lithuania	15.33	1
13	(German Basketball Federation) Germany	13.33	0

Rank	Association	Average points	Teams
14	(Portuguese Basketball Federation) Portugal	10.00	0
14	(Latvian Basketball Association) Latvia	10.00	0
16	(Israeli Basketball Association) Israel	9.33	0
17	(Basketball Federation of Serbia) Serbia	8.67	1
17	(Swiss Basketball) Switzerland	8.67	0
19	(Slovak Basketball Association) Slovakia	7.33	0
20	(Croatian Basketball Federation) Croatia	4.00	0
21	(Luxembourg Basketball Federation) Luxembourg	2.67	0
22	(Basketball Federation of Kosovo) Kosovo	2.00	0
23	(Bulgarian Basketball Federation) Bulgaria	1.33	0
23	(Cyprus Basketball Federation) Cyprus	1.33	0
23	(Basketball Finland) Finland	1.33	0
23	(Basketball Federation of Armenia) Armenia	1.33	0

== Teams ==
The labels in the parentheses show how each team qualified for the place of its starting round:

- TH EL: EuroLeague Women title holders
- TH EC: EuroCup Women title holders
- 1st, 2nd, 3rd etc.: League position of the previous season
- RS: Regular season winners
- CW: Cup winners
- CR: Cup runners-up

Also, S means that the team in the qualifying round was seeded.

The teams were announced on 6 July 2026, with a total of 24 clubs registering for the competition. Since the previous season, the host team of the Final Six are allowed to enter the qualifiers if they had they not qualified on merit (however, this spot wasn't taken as Casademont Zaragoza qualified via their domestic league). Another rule change is that the EuroLeague Women title holders can take part regardless of their domestic league result.

Regular season
(Turkish Basketball Federation) Fenerbahçe Tarfin ^{TH EL} (1st)	(Turkish Basketball Federation) Galatasaray Çağdaş Faktoring (2nd)
(Spanish Basketball Federation) Valencia Basket (1st)	(Spanish Basketball Federation) Casademont Zaragoza (2nd)
(French Federation of Basketball) Basket Landes (1st)	(French Federation of Basketball) Tango Bourges Basket (2nd)
(Czech Basketball Federation) ZVVZ USK Praha (1st)	(Italian Basketball Federation) Beretta Famila Schio (1st)
(Polish Basketball Federation) AZS UMCS Lublin (1st)	(Hellenic Basketball Federation) Athinaikos Qualco (1st)
(Basketball Belgium) Kangoeroes Basket Mechelen (1st)	(Romanian Basketball Federation) CS Rapid București (1st)
Qualifying round
(Turkish Basketball Federation) Emlak Konut (3rd)	(Spanish Basketball Federation) Spar Girona (3rd)
(French Federation of Basketball) Flammes Carolo Basket (3rd)	(Czech Basketball Federation) Žabiny Brno (2nd)
(Czech Basketball Federation) KP Brno (3rd)	(Italian Basketball Federation) Umana Reyer Venezia (2nd)
(Hungarian Basketball Federation) DVTK HUN-Therm (2nd)	(Hungarian Basketball Federation) Sopron Basket (3rd)
(Polish Basketball Federation) AZS Poznań (2nd)	(Hellenic Basketball Federation) Panathinaikos AC (2nd)
(Lithuanian Basketball Federation) Kibirkštis-TOKS (1st)	(Basketball Federation of Serbia) KKZ Crvena zvezda (1st)

== Round and draw dates ==
=== Schedule ===
Phase	Draw date	Round	Round date
Qualification round	16 July 2026	Semifinal	23 September 2026
Qualification round	16 July 2026	Final	30 September 2026
Regular season (First Round)	16 July 2026	Matchday 1	14 October 2026
Regular season (First Round)	16 July 2026	Matchday 2	21 October 2026
Regular season (First Round)	16 July 2026	Matchday 3	28 October 2026
Regular season (First Round)	16 July 2026	Matchday 4	3 November 2026
Regular season (First Round)	16 July 2026	Matchday 5	25 November 2026
Regular season (First Round)	16 July 2026	Matchday 6	2 December 2026
Regular season (Second Round)	16 July 2026	Matchday 7	16 December 2026
Regular season (Second Round)	16 July 2026	Matchday 8	6 January 2027
Regular season (Second Round)	16 July 2026	Matchday 9	13 January 2027
Regular season (Second Round)	16 July 2026	Matchday 10	20 January 2027
Regular season (Second Round)	16 July 2026	Matchday 11	27 January 2027
Regular season (Second Round)	16 July 2026	Matchday 12	2 February 2027
Play-Ins	16 July 2026	Game 1	24 February 2027
Play-Ins	16 July 2026	Game 2	3 March 2027
Play-Ins	16 July 2026	Game 3	10 March 2027
Final Six	16 July 2026	Quarterfinals	14 April 2027
Final Six	16 July 2026	Semifinals	16 April 2027
Final Six	16 July 2026	Final	18 April 2027

=== Draw ===
The seeding was announced on 10 July 2026. The draw took place in Munich, Germany, on 16 July 2026. No more than one club from the same country can be in the same regular season group.

Seed 1	Seed 2	Seed 3	Seed 4
(Turkish Basketball Federation) Fenerbahçe Tarfin (Czech Basketball Federation) ZVVZ USK Praha (Spanish Basketball Federation) Casademont Zaragoza (Turkish Basketball Federation) Galatasaray Çağdaş Faktoring	(Italian Basketball Federation) Beretta Famila Schio (Spanish Basketball Federation) Valencia Basket (French Federation of Basketball) Basket Landes (French Federation of Basketball) Tango Bourges Basket	(Polish Basketball Federation) AZS UMCS Lublin (Hellenic Basketball Federation) Athinaikos Qualco (Basketball Belgium) Kangoeroes Basket Mechelen (Romanian Basketball Federation) CS Rapid București	(N/A) Qualifiers 1 (Note: The eventual team in this slot was Kibirkštis-TOKS.) (N/A) Qualifiers 2 (Note: The eventual team in this slot was KKZ Crvena zvezda.) (N/A) Qualifiers 3 (Note: The eventual team in this slot was Emlak Konut SK.) (N/A) Qualifiers 4 (Note: The eventual team in this slot was Flammes Carolo Basket.)

== Qualification round ==
The winners advanced to the regular season, while the losers dropped down to the EuroCup regular season.

Path 1

Semifinal			Final
			1	(Hungarian Basketball Federation) Sopron Basket	62
2	(Lithuanian Basketball Federation) Kibirkštis-TOKS	91	2	(Lithuanian Basketball Federation) Kibirkštis-TOKS	81
3	(Polish Basketball Federation) AZS Poznań	69

Path 2

Semifinal			Final
			1	(Hungarian Basketball Federation) DVTK HUN-Therm	66
2	(Czech Basketball Federation) Žabiny Brno	69	3	(Basketball Federation of Serbia) KKZ Crvena zvezda	71
3	(Basketball Federation of Serbia) KKZ Crvena zvezda	75

Path 3

Semifinal			Final
			1	(Spanish Basketball Federation) Spar Girona	69
2	(Hellenic Basketball Federation) Panathinaikos AC	68	3	(Turkish Basketball Federation) Emlak Konut	81
3	(Turkish Basketball Federation) Emlak Konut	91

Path 4

Semifinal			Final
			1	(Italian Basketball Federation) Umana Reyer Venezia	55
2	(French Federation of Basketball) Flammes Carolo Basket	101	2	(French Federation of Basketball) Flammes Carolo Basket	81
3	(Czech Basketball Federation) KP Brno	81

== Regular season ==
Location of teams of the 2026–27 Euroleague Women regular season.
Red: Group A; Green: Group B; Yellow: Group C; Blue: Group D.

If teams are level on record at the end of the regular season, tiebreakers are applied in the following order:

1. Head-to-head record
2. Head-to-head point differential
3. Head-to-head points scored
4. Point differential for the entire regular season
5. Points scored for the entire regular season

=== First round ===
==== Group A ====
Pos	Team	Pld	W	L	PF	PA	PD	Pts	Qualification	CAS	KIB	LAN	ATH
1	(Spanish Basketball Federation) Casademont Zaragoza (Q)	4	4	0	312	277	+35	8	Second round	—	77–55	76–75	25 Nov
2	(Lithuanian Basketball Federation) Kibirkštis-TOKS	4	2	2	295	286	+9	6	Second round	2 Dec	—	25 Nov	103–65
3	(French Federation of Basketball) Basket Landes	4	1	3	289	284	+5	5	Second round	69–70	67–73	—	2 Dec
4	(Hellenic Basketball Federation) Athinaikos Qualco	4	1	3	285	334	−49	5	EuroCup Women	78–89	77–64	65–78	—

Updated to match(es) played on 3 November 2026. Source: EuroLeague Women
Legend: Blue = home team win; Red = away team win.
Rules for classification: 1) Points; 2) Points difference; 3) Points scored.
(Q) Qualified for the phase indicated

==== Group B ====
Pos	Team	Pld	W	L	PF	PA	PD	Pts	Qualification	SCH	CZV	GAL	KAN
1	(Italian Basketball Federation) Beretta Famila Schio (Q)	4	3	1	302	253	+49	7	Second round	—	84–72	51–68	2 Dec
2	(Basketball Federation of Serbia) KKZ Crvena zvezda (Q)	4	3	1	326	277	+49	7	Second round	25 Nov	—	2 Dec	89–56
3	(Turkish Basketball Federation) Galatasaray Çağdaş Faktoring	4	2	2	279	263	+16	6	Second round	66–84	68–78	—	25 Nov
4	(Basketball Belgium) Kangoeroes Basket Mechelen	4	0	4	222	336	−114	4	EuroCup Women	47–83	69–87	50–77	—

Updated to match(es) played on 4 November 2026. Source: EuroLeague Women
Legend: Blue = home team win; Red = away team win.
Rules for classification: 1) Points; 2) Points difference; 3) Points scored.
(Q) Qualified for the phase indicated

==== Group C ====
Pos	Team	Pld	W	L	PF	PA	PD	Pts	Qualification	FEN	FLA	VAL	RAP
1	(Turkish Basketball Federation) Fenerbahçe Tarfin (Q)	4	3	1	341	264	+77	7	Second round	—	81–71	71–73	25 Nov
2	(French Federation of Basketball) Flammes Carolo Basket (Q)	4	3	1	349	274	+75	7	Second round	2 Dec	—	25 Nov	98–66
3	(Spanish Basketball Federation) Valencia Basket	4	2	2	310	283	+27	6	Second round	69–88	63–77	—	105–47
4	(Romanian Basketball Federation) CS Rapid București	4	0	4	228	407	−179	4	EuroCup Women	51–101	64–103	2 Dec	—

Updated to match(es) played on 3 November 2026. Source: EuroLeague Women
Legend: Blue = home team win; Red = away team win.
Rules for classification: 1) Points; 2) Points difference; 3) Points scored.
(Q) Qualified for the phase indicated

==== Group D ====
Pos	Team	Pld	W	L	PF	PA	PD	Pts	Qualification	PRA	TAN	EKO	LUB
1	(Czech Basketball Federation) ZVVZ USK Praha	4	3	1	311	276	+35	7	Second round	—	76–55	80–65	25 Nov
2	(French Federation of Basketball) Tango Bourges Basket	4	3	1	307	300	+7	7	Second round	85–81	—	79–74	2 Dec
3	(Turkish Basketball Federation) Emlak Konut	4	1	3	303	305	−2	5	Second round	2 Dec	25 Nov	—	85–61
4	(Polish Basketball Federation) AZS UMCS Lublin	4	1	3	286	326	−40	5	EuroCup Women	71–74	69–88	85–79	—

Updated to match(es) played on 3 November 2026. Source: EuroLeague Women
Legend: Blue = home team win; Red = away team win.
Rules for classification: 1) Points; 2) Points difference; 3) Points scored.

== Play ins ==
=== Semifinal play ins ===
Team 1	Series	Team 2	Game 1	Game 2	Game 3
	–		–	–	–
	–		–	–	–

=== Quarterfinal play ins ===
Team 1	Series	Team 2	Game 1	Game 2	Game 3
	–		–	–	–
	–		–	–	–

== Final six ==
On 2 December 2024, the Pabellón Príncipe Felipe in Zaragoza was announced as the host of the final six for the next three years, starting from 2025.

== Awards ==
=== EuroLeague MVP ===
Player	Team	Ref.

=== EuroLeague Final Four MVP ===
Player	Team	Ref.

=== All-EuroLeague Teams ===
First Team
(N/A) Player	(N/A) Team
(N/A) Player	(N/A) Team
(N/A) Player	(N/A) Team
(N/A) Player	(N/A) Team
(N/A) Player	(N/A) Team

Second Team
(N/A) Player	(N/A) Team
(N/A) Player	(N/A) Team
(N/A) Player	(N/A) Team
(N/A) Player	(N/A) Team
(N/A) Player	(N/A) Team

=== Defensive Player of the Year ===
Player	Team	Ref.

=== Young Player of the Year ===
Player	Team	Ref.

=== Coach of the Year ===
Player	Team	Ref.

=== Best Play of the Season ===
Player	Team	Ref.

=== Club Excellence Award ===
Player	Team	Ref.

=== MVP of the Month ===
Month	Player	Team	Ref.
October	(North Macedonia) Merritt Hempe	(Spain) Casademont Zaragoza	
November			
December			
January			
February			

=== Team of the Month ===
Month	PG	SG	SF	PF	C	Ref.
October	(Latvia) Kitija Laksa ( (Italy) Beretta Famila Schio)	(France) Coline Franchelin ( (France) Flammes Carolo Basket)	(Poland) Stephanie Mavunga ( (Turkey) Emlak Konut)	(North Macedonia) Merritt Hempe ( (Spain) Casademont Zaragoza)	(United States) Lauren Betts ( (Turkey) Fenerbahçe Tarfin)	
November	(N/A) Player ( (N/A) Team)	(N/A) Player ( (N/A) Team)	(N/A) Player ( (N/A) Team)	(N/A) Player ( (N/A) Team)	(N/A) Player ( (N/A) Team)	
December	(N/A) Player ( (N/A) Team)	(N/A) Player ( (N/A) Team)	(N/A) Player ( (N/A) Team)	(N/A) Player ( (N/A) Team)	(N/A) Player ( (N/A) Team)	
January	(N/A) Player ( (N/A) Team)	(N/A) Player ( (N/A) Team)	(N/A) Player ( (N/A) Team)	(N/A) Player ( (N/A) Team)	(N/A) Player ( (N/A) Team)	
February	(N/A) Player ( (N/A) Team)	(N/A) Player ( (N/A) Team)	(N/A) Player ( (N/A) Team)	(N/A) Player ( (N/A) Team)	(N/A) Player ( (N/A) Team)	

=== MVP of the Round ===
First round

Round	PG	SG	SF	PF	C	Ref.
1	(Spain) Mariona Ortiz ( (Spain) Casademont Zaragoza)	(France) Coline Franchelin ( (France) Flammes Carolo Basket)	(Puerto Rico) Trinity San Antonio ( (France) Basket Landes)	(Poland) Stephanie Mavunga ( (Turkey) Emlak Konut)	(Azerbaijan) Brianna Fraser ( (Czech Republic) ZVVZ USK Praha)	
2	(Latvia) Kitija Laksa ( (Italy) Beretta Famila Schio)	(France) Ornella Bankole ( (Spain) Casademont Zaragoza)	(Mali) Mariam Coulibaly ( (Italy) Beretta Famila Schio)	(North Macedonia) Merritt Hempe ( (Spain) Casademont Zaragoza)	(Lithuania) Daugile Use ( (Lithuania) Kibirkštis-TOKS)	
3	(France) Pauline Astier ( (Czech Republic) ZVVZ USK Praha)	(France) Marie-Paule Foppossi ( (France) Tango Bourges Basket)	(Greece) Artemis Spanou ( (Serbia) KKZ Crvena zvezda)	(Australia) Chloe Bibby ( (Spain) Valencia Basket)	(Finland) Awak Kuier ( (Turkey) Galatasaray Çağdaş Faktoring)	
4	(France) Alix Duchet ( (France) Tango Bourges Basket)	(United States) Aliyah Collier ( (Serbia) KKZ Crvena zvezda)	(United States) Shyanne Sellers ( (Poland) AZS UMCS Lublin)	(Poland) Stephanie Mavunga ( (Turkey) Emlak Konut)	(Romania) Claudia Cuic ( (Romania) CS Rapid București)	
5	(N/A) Player ( (N/A) Team)	(N/A) Player ( (N/A) Team)	(N/A) Player ( (N/A) Team)	(N/A) Player ( (N/A) Team)	(N/A) Player ( (N/A) Team)	
6	(N/A) Player ( (N/A) Team)	(N/A) Player ( (N/A) Team)	(N/A) Player ( (N/A) Team)	(N/A) Player ( (N/A) Team)	(N/A) Player ( (N/A) Team)	

Second round

Round	PG	SG	SF	PF	C	Ref.
7	(N/A) Player ( (N/A) Team)	(N/A) Player ( (N/A) Team)	(N/A) Player ( (N/A) Team)	(N/A) Player ( (N/A) Team)	(N/A) Player ( (N/A) Team)	
8	(N/A) Player ( (N/A) Team)	(N/A) Player ( (N/A) Team)	(N/A) Player ( (N/A) Team)	(N/A) Player ( (N/A) Team)	(N/A) Player ( (N/A) Team)	
9	(N/A) Player ( (N/A) Team)	(N/A) Player ( (N/A) Team)	(N/A) Player ( (N/A) Team)	(N/A) Player ( (N/A) Team)	(N/A) Player ( (N/A) Team)	
10	(N/A) Player ( (N/A) Team)	(N/A) Player ( (N/A) Team)	(N/A) Player ( (N/A) Team)	(N/A) Player ( (N/A) Team)	(N/A) Player ( (N/A) Team)	
11	(N/A) Player ( (N/A) Team)	(N/A) Player ( (N/A) Team)	(N/A) Player ( (N/A) Team)	(N/A) Player ( (N/A) Team)	(N/A) Player ( (N/A) Team)	
12	(N/A) Player ( (N/A) Team)	(N/A) Player ( (N/A) Team)	(N/A) Player ( (N/A) Team)	(N/A) Player ( (N/A) Team)	(N/A) Player ( (N/A) Team)	

Play Ins

Round	PG	SG	SF	PF	C	Ref.
Game 1	(N/A) Player ( (N/A) Team)	(N/A) Player ( (N/A) Team)	(N/A) Player ( (N/A) Team)	(N/A) Player ( (N/A) Team)	(N/A) Player ( (N/A) Team)	
Game 2	(N/A) Player ( (N/A) Team)	(N/A) Player ( (N/A) Team)	(N/A) Player ( (N/A) Team)	(N/A) Player ( (N/A) Team)	(N/A) Player ( (N/A) Team)	
Game 3	(N/A) Player ( (N/A) Team)	(N/A) Player ( (N/A) Team)	(N/A) Player ( (N/A) Team)	(N/A) Player ( (N/A) Team)	(N/A) Player ( (N/A) Team)	

Final Six

Round	PG	SG	SF	PF	C	Ref.
Quarterfinals	(N/A) Player ( (N/A) Team)	(N/A) Player ( (N/A) Team)	(N/A) Player ( (N/A) Team)	(N/A) Player ( (N/A) Team)	(N/A) Player ( (N/A) Team)	
Semifinals	(N/A) Player ( (N/A) Team)	(N/A) Player ( (N/A) Team)	(N/A) Player ( (N/A) Team)	(N/A) Player ( (N/A) Team)	(N/A) Player ( (N/A) Team)	

== See also ==
- 2026–27 EuroCup Women
- 2026–27 EuroCup Women qualification round
- 2026–27 EuroCup Women regular season
- 2026–27 EuroCup Women knockout stage
- 2026 FIBA Europe SuperCup Women
- 2026–27 EuroLeague
