= Nicole Enabosi =

Nigerian basketball player (born 1997)

No. 33 – Chartres
- Position: Power forward
- League: La Boulangère Wonderligue

Personal information
- Born: 26 March 1997 (age 29) New Jersey, U.S.
- Listed height: 1.83 m (6 ft 0 in)

Career information
- High school: Our Lady of Good Counsel (Olney, Maryland)
- College: Delaware Fightin' Blue Hens
- WNBA draft: 2020: undrafted
- Playing career: 2020–present

Career history
- 2020-2021: MBK Ružomberok
- 2021–2022: Herner TC
- 2022–2023: Chartres
- 2023–2024: Toulouse
- 2024–present: Chartres

Career highlights
- CAA Player of the year (2018); 2x CAA All-Defensive Team (2017, 2018); 3x First-team All-CAA (2017, 2018, 2020); CAA All-Freshman Team (2016)

Nicole Ehizele Enabosi (born 26 March 1997) is a basketball player who plays as a power forward for Slovak Women's Extraliga club MBK Ružomberok. Born in the United States, she represents Nigeria at international level.

== High school ==
Enabosi attended Our Lady of Good Counsel High School (Montgomery County, Maryland)

== College career ==
Enabosi started playing for the Delaware Fightin' Blue Hens in 2015–16 season, she averaged 8.9 PPG and 7.1 RPG in her freshman year. In her sophomore year, she averaged 13.7 PPG and 10.0 RPG. In her 3rd year, she averaged 18.0PPG and 11.8 RPG. She was named the Colonial Athletic Association (CAA) player of the year for the 2017–18 season.

Enabosi missed the 2018–19 season due to injury, she tore her anterior cruciate ligament (ACL) and hurt her knee during the try outs with the Nigerian Women's basketball team preparations for the 2018 FIBA Women's World cup in Spain.

Enabosi resumed playing for Delaware in the 2019–20 season as a graduate Student, she was named in the CAA 2019 preseason All conference team and she has been named the CCA player of the week twice.

=== Delaware statistics ===
Ratios
Year	Team	GP	FG%	3P%	FT%	RBG	APG	BPG	SPG	PPG
2015-16	Delaware	31	45.5%	–	60.8%	7.10	0.68	1.07	1.26	8.87
2016-17	Delaware	29	45.3%	50.0%	72.6%	9.97	2.31	0.90	1.83	13.69
2017-18	Delaware	32	50.8%	66.7%	70.7%	11.81	2.25	1.91	2.00	18.03
2018-19	Delaware	Medical redshirt								
2019-20	Delaware	25	53.2%	–	67.6%	8.40	2.12	0.84	1.64	17.08
Career		117	49.2%	42.9%	68.6%	9.38	1.82	1.21	1.68	14.32

Totals
Year	Team	GP	FG	FGA	3P	3PA	FT	FTA	REB	A	BK	ST	PTS
2015-16	Delaware	31	91	200	0	0	93	153	220	21	33	39	275
2016-17	Delaware	29	121	267	1	2	154	212	289	67	26	53	397
2017-18	Delaware	32	202	398	2	3	171	242	378	72	61	64	577
2018-19	Delaware	Medical redshirt											
2019-20	Delaware	25	151	284	0	2	125	185	210	53	21	41	427
Career		117	565	1149	3	7	543	792	1097	213	141	197	1676

== Professional career ==
Nicole declared for the 2020 WNBA Draft but went undrafted. In 2020, she joined the Slovak team MBK Ružomberok and help the team the retain the 2021 Slovak Women's Basketball Extraliga. She averaged 16 points, 7.5 rebounds and 1.6 assists in her first season at the club.
