= 2026–27 EuroLeague Women regular season =

EuroLeague Women regular season
- Season: 2026–27
- Dates: 14 October 2026 – 2 February 2027
- Games played: 84
- Teams: 16

The 2026–27 EuroLeague Women regular season began on 14 October 2026 and will end on 2 February 2027.

== Format ==
- Regular season (First round)

After the qualifiers, 16 teams will be split into 4 groups of four, where the top three from each group advances to the second round. The fourth place teams drop down to the EuroCup Women knockout stage. The advancing teams' records from the first round are carried over into the next round.

- Regular season (Second round)

The 12 remaining teams form 2 groups of six and will play the teams they have not played in the first round. In both groups, the top 2 will play the Semi-Final play-ins while 3rd and 4th play the Quarter-Final play-ins. The teams who finish fifth and sixth are eliminated.

== Draw ==
External videos
- Draw

The seeding was announced on 10 July 2026. The draw took place at 11:00 CET in Munich, Germany on 16 July 2026. Only a maximum of one club from the same country can be in the same regular season group. The seeding is based on the club rankings.

Key to colours
Teams advancing to the Second round
Teams advancing to the Quarterfinal play-ins
Teams advancing to the Semifinal play-ins

Pot 1
Team	Rank	Points
(Turkish Basketball Federation) Fenerbahçe Tarfin	1	336
(Czech Basketball Federation) ZVVZ USK Praha	2	243
(Spanish Basketball Federation) Casademont Zaragoza	5	155
(Turkish Basketball Federation) Galatasaray Çağdaş Faktoring	6	134

Pot 2
Team	Rank	Points
(Italian Basketball Federation) Beretta Famila Schio	7	125
(Spanish Basketball Federation) Valencia Basket	8	108
(French Federation of Basketball) Basket Landes	10	101
(French Federation of Basketball) Tango Bourges Basket	13	79

Pot 3
Team	Rank	Points
(Polish Basketball Federation) AZS UMCS Lublin	21	38
(Hellenic Basketball Federation) Athinaikos Qualco	31	30
(Basketball Belgium) Kangoeroes Basket Mechelen	36	28
(Romanian Basketball Federation) CS Rapid București	63	10

Pot 4
Team	Rank	Points
(Lithuanian Basketball Federation) Kibirkštis-TOKS (Note: Team not known at the time of the draw. Was the Path 1 Final Winner in the EuroLeague Women qualification.)	31	30
(Basketball Federation of Serbia) KKZ Crvena zvezda (Note: Team not known at the time of the draw. Was the Path 2 Final Winner in the EuroLeague Women qualification.)	45	20
(Turkish Basketball Federation) Emlak Konut (Note: Team not known at the time of the draw. Was the Path 3 Final Winner in the EuroLeague Women qualification.)	57	14
(French Federation of Basketball) Flammes Carolo Basket (Note: Team not known at the time of the draw. Was the Path 4 Final Winner in the EuroLeague Women qualification.)	36	28

== First round ==
=== Group A ===
Pos	Team	Pld	W	L	PF	PA	PD	Pts	Qualification	CAS	KIB	LAN	ATH
1	(Spanish Basketball Federation) Casademont Zaragoza (Q)	4	4	0	312	277	+35	8	Second round	—	77–55	76–75	25 Nov
2	(Lithuanian Basketball Federation) Kibirkštis-TOKS	4	2	2	295	286	+9	6	Second round	2 Dec	—	25 Nov	103–65
3	(French Federation of Basketball) Basket Landes	4	1	3	289	284	+5	5	Second round	69–70	67–73	—	2 Dec
4	(Hellenic Basketball Federation) Athinaikos Qualco	4	1	3	285	334	−49	5	EuroCup Women	78–89	77–64	65–78	—

Updated to match(es) played on 3 November 2026. Source: EuroLeague Women
Legend: Blue = home team win; Red = away team win.
Rules for classification: 1) Points; 2) Points difference; 3) Points scored.
(Q) Qualified for the phase indicated

14 October 2026
20:00 (CEST)

Boxscore

Casademont Zaragoza (Spanish Basketball Federation)	76–75 (OT)	(French Federation of Basketball) Basket Landes
Scoring by quarter: 25–14, 13–20, 19–20, 11–14, Overtime: 8–7
Pts: Hempe 26; Rebs: Fingall 7 Asts: Ortiz 15		Pts: San Antonio 23; Rebs: Daramy 6 Asts: three players 4

Pabellón Príncipe Felipe, Zaragoza
Attendance: 5,370
Referees: Özlem Yalman, Sara Månsson, Primož Pipan

14 October 2026
19:00 (EEET)

Boxscore

Kibirkštis-TOKS (Lithuanian Basketball Federation)	103–65	(Hellenic Basketball Federation) Athinaikos Qualco
Scoring by quarter: 30–20, 22–12, 27–10, 24–23
Pts: Woolfork 20; Rebs: Wadoux 9 Asts: Wadoux 9		Pts: Fasoula, Vanloo 14; Rebs: Fasoula 5 Asts: Vanloo 7

Active Vilnius Arena, Vilnius
Attendance: 1,875
Referees: Ivana Ivanovic, Jan Baloun, Romana Rea Car

21 October 2026
20:30 (EEST)

Boxscore

Athinaikos Qualco (Hellenic Basketball Federation)	78–89	(Spanish Basketball Federation) Casademont Zaragoza
Scoring by quarter: 12–25, 23–21, 23–20, 20–23
Pts: Macaulay 24; Rebs: Macaulay, Prince 6 Asts: Vanloo 8		Pts: Hempe 29; Rebs: Hempe 11; Asts: Ortiz 10

Glyfada Hall, Glyfada
Attendance: 300
Referees: Viola Györgyi, Laure Coanus, Irene Frosolini

21 October 2026
19:30 (CEST)

Boxscore

Basket Landes (French Federation of Basketball)	67–73	(Lithuanian Basketball Federation) Kibirkštis-TOKS
Scoring by quarter: 24–22, 10–15, 19–24, 14–12
Pts: San Antonio 18; Rebs: three players 5 Asts: San Antonio 6		Pts: Use 18; Rebs: Use 18; Asts: Wadoux 6

Espace François Mitterrand, Mont-de-Marsan
Attendance: 3,200
Referees: Bogna Podkowińska, Roberto Lucas Martínez, Javier Torres Sánchez

29 October 2026
20:00 (CET)

Boxscore

Casademont Zaragoza (Spanish Basketball Federation)	77–55	(Lithuanian Basketball Federation) Kibirkštis-TOKS
Scoring by quarter: 25–22, 20–9, 18–6, 14–18
Pts: Sheppard 16; Rebs: Flores 9 Asts: Ortiz 6		Pts: Becker 17; Rebs: Becker 8 Asts: Wadoux, Sinickaitė 4

Pabellón Príncipe Felipe, Zaragoza
Attendance: 5,010
Referees: Vlad-Theodor Cotrobas-Dascalu, Jordan Wallet, Armin Mutapcic

28 October 2026
20:30 (EET)

Boxscore

Athinaikos Qualco (Hellenic Basketball Federation)	65–78	(French Federation of Basketball) Basket Landes
Scoring by quarter: 15–15, 18–22, 22–23, 10–18
Pts: Prince 15; Rebs: Prince 9 Asts: Vanloo 10		Pts: Elenga 15; Rebs: Daramy 8 Asts: Droguet, Daramy 5

Glyfada Hall, Glyfada
Attendance: 400
Referees: Jelena Tomic, Mikheil Vartanov, Svetlana Stoyanova

3 November 2026
20:30 (EET)

Boxscore

Athinaikos Qualco (Hellenic Basketball Federation)	77–64	(Lithuanian Basketball Federation) Kibirkštis-TOKS
Scoring by quarter: 19–19, 25–17, 16–16, 17–12
Pts: Parks 26; Rebs: Fasoula 9 Asts: Vanloo 12		Pts: Wadoux 17; Rebs: Meškonytė 6 Asts: Wadoux 4

Glyfada Hall, Glyfada
Attendance: 100
Referees: Kirile Tvauri, Danilo Petkovic, Romana Stojanović

3 November 2026
19:30 (CET)

Boxscore

Basket Landes (French Federation of Basketball)	69–70	(Spanish Basketball Federation) Casademont Zaragoza
Scoring by quarter: 12–15, 20–19, 22–19, 15–17
Pts: San Antonio 13; Rebs: Daramy 7 Asts: Pardon 4		Pts: Hempe 21; Rebs: Oma 6 Asts: Ortiz

Espace François Mitterrand, Mont-de-Marsan
Attendance: 3,200
Referees: Özlem Yalman, Alessandro Perciavalle, Romana Rea Car

25 November 2026
20:00 (CET)

Boxscore

Casademont Zaragoza (Spanish Basketball Federation)	vs.	(Hellenic Basketball Federation) Athinaikos Qualco

Pabellón Príncipe Felipe, Zaragoza

25 November 2026
19:00 (EET)

Boxscore

Kibirkštis-TOKS (Lithuanian Basketball Federation)	vs.	(French Federation of Basketball) Basket Landes

Active Vilnius Arena, Vilnius

2 December 2026
19:00 (EET)

Boxscore

Kibirkštis-TOKS (Lithuanian Basketball Federation)	vs.	(Spanish Basketball Federation) Casademont Zaragoza

Active Vilnius Arena, Vilnius

2 December 2026
19:30 (CET)

Boxscore

Basket Landes (French Federation of Basketball)	vs.	(Hellenic Basketball Federation) Athinaikos Qualco

Espace François Mitterrand, Mont-de-Marsan

=== Group B ===
Pos	Team	Pld	W	L	PF	PA	PD	Pts	Qualification	SCH	CZV	GAL	KAN
1	(Italian Basketball Federation) Beretta Famila Schio (Q)	4	3	1	302	253	+49	7	Second round	—	84–72	51–68	2 Dec
2	(Basketball Federation of Serbia) KKZ Crvena zvezda (Q)	4	3	1	326	277	+49	7	Second round	25 Nov	—	2 Dec	89–56
3	(Turkish Basketball Federation) Galatasaray Çağdaş Faktoring	4	2	2	279	263	+16	6	Second round	66–84	68–78	—	25 Nov
4	(Basketball Belgium) Kangoeroes Basket Mechelen	4	0	4	222	336	−114	4	EuroCup Women	47–83	69–87	50–77	—

Updated to match(es) played on 4 November 2026. Source: EuroLeague Women
Legend: Blue = home team win; Red = away team win.
Rules for classification: 1) Points; 2) Points difference; 3) Points scored.
(Q) Qualified for the phase indicated

15 October 2026
20:00 (TRT)

Boxscore

Galatasaray Çağdaş Faktoring (Turkish Basketball Federation)	66–84	(Italian Basketball Federation) Beretta Famila Schio
Scoring by quarter: 17–23, 18–20, 20–22, 11–19
Pts: Kuier 16; Rebs: Bayram 8 Asts: Kuier 7		Pts: Laksa 18; Rebs: Bertsch 6 Asts: Zanardi, Verona 7

Sinan Erdem Dome, Istanbul
Attendance: 121
Referees: Marius Ciulin, Tomasz Wit Langowski, Paulina Gajdosz

14 October 2026
18:00 (CEST)

Boxscore

KKZ Crvena zvezda (Basketball Federation of Serbia)	89–56	(Basketball Belgium) Kangoeroes Basket Mechelen
Scoring by quarter: 25–16, 13–11, 28–14, 23–15
Pts: Henderson 18; Rebs: Spanou 10; Asts: Turudic 3		Pts: Ben Abdelkader 18; Rebs: Parham 7 Asts: Résimont 4

Ranko Žeravica Sports Hall, Belgrade
Attendance: 500
Referees: Esperanza Mendoza, Ewa Matuszewska, Georgios Martinakos

22 October 2026
21:30 (CEST)

Boxscore

Kangoeroes Basket Mechelen (Basketball Belgium)	50–77	(Turkish Basketball Federation) Galatasaray Çağdaş Faktoring
Scoring by quarter: 18–19, 5–13, 14–20, 13–25
Pts: Sullivan 15; Rebs: Parham 10; Asts: Nauwelaers 6		Pts: Erdoğan 11; Rebs: five players 5 Asts: four players 3

De Nekker, Mechelen
Attendance: 750
Referees: Lauri Jäämaa, Paweł Pacek, Marek Kukelčík

22 October 2026
20:00 (CEST)

Boxscore

Beretta Famila Schio (Italian Basketball Federation)	84–72	(Basketball Federation of Serbia) KKZ Crvena zvezda
Scoring by quarter: 19–18, 18–16, 20–14, 27–24
Pts: Laksa 24; Rebs: Coulibaly 13; Asts: Verona 6		Pts: Collier 19; Rebs: Scherf, Spanou 6 Asts: Henderson 8

Palazzetto Livio Romare, Schio
Attendance: 2,150
Referees: Milita Stalausinskaitė, Primož Pipan, Romana Stojanović

29 October 2026
20:00 (TRT)

Boxscore

Galatasaray Çağdaş Faktoring (Turkish Basketball Federation)	68–78	(Basketball Federation of Serbia) KKZ Crvena zvezda
Scoring by quarter: 24–19, 14–19, 16–19, 14–21
Pts: Kuier 20; Rebs: Fauthoux 10; Asts: Fauthoux 6		Pts: Spanou 21; Rebs: Spanou 10; Asts: Henderson 5

Sinan Erdem Dome, Istanbul
Attendance: 1,314
Referees: Esperanza Mendoza, Bogna Podkowinska, Amalia Marchiş

29 October 2026
20:30 (CEST)

Boxscore

Kangoeroes Basket Mechelen (Basketball Belgium)	47–83	(Italian Basketball Federation) Beretta Famila Schio
Scoring by quarter: 12–25, 10–22, 14–15, 11–21
Pts: Huijbens 14; Rebs: Huijbens 9 Asts: Nauwelaers 3		Pts: Andrè 14; Rebs: Conde 7 Asts: Conde 5

De Nekker, Mechelen
Attendance: 230
Referees: Ivana Ivanovic, Ewa Matuszewska, Michal Kuzia

4 November 2026
20:30 (CET)

Boxscore

Kangoeroes Basket Mechelen (Basketball Belgium)	69–87	(Basketball Federation of Serbia) KKZ Crvena zvezda
Scoring by quarter: 20–23, 15–15, 12–33, 22–16
Pts: Résimont, Ben Abdelkader 18; Rebs: Huijbens 8 Asts: Nauwelaers 4		Pts: Collier 23; Rebs: Spanou 11; Asts: Henderson 7

De Nekker, Mechelen
Attendance: 200
Referees: Laure Coanus, Svetlana Stoyanova, Maximilian Meiler

4 November 2026
20:00 (CET)

Boxscore

Beretta Famila Schio (Italian Basketball Federation)	51–68	(Turkish Basketball Federation) Galatasaray Çağdaş Faktoring
Scoring by quarter: 13–24, 9–17, 13–7, 16–20
Pts: Verona, Coulibaly 11; Rebs: Coulibaly 11; Asts: Zanardi 7		Pts: Smalls 17; Rebs: Juhász 11; Asts: Juhász 3

Palazzetto Livio Romare, Schio
Attendance: 2,150
Referees: Nataša Dragojević, Veronika Obertova, Goran Grbić

25 November 2026
20:00 (TRT)

Boxscore

Galatasaray Çağdaş Faktoring (Turkish Basketball Federation)	vs.	(Basketball Belgium) Kangoeroes Basket Mechelen

Sinan Erdem Dome, Istanbul

25 November 2026
18:00 (CET)

Boxscore

KKZ Crvena zvezda (Basketball Federation of Serbia)	vs.	(Italian Basketball Federation) Beretta Famila Schio

Ranko Žeravica Sports Hall, Belgrade

2 December 2026
18:00 (CET)

Boxscore

KKZ Crvena zvezda (Basketball Federation of Serbia)	vs.	(Turkish Basketball Federation) Galatasaray Çağdaş Faktoring

Ranko Žeravica Sports Hall, Belgrade

2 December 2026
20:00 (CET)

Boxscore

Beretta Famila Schio (Italian Basketball Federation)	vs.	(Basketball Belgium) Kangoeroes Basket Mechelen

Palazzetto Livio Romare, Schio

=== Group C ===
Pos	Team	Pld	W	L	PF	PA	PD	Pts	Qualification	FEN	FLA	VAL	RAP
1	(Turkish Basketball Federation) Fenerbahçe Tarfin (Q)	4	3	1	341	264	+77	7	Second round	—	81–71	71–73	25 Nov
2	(French Federation of Basketball) Flammes Carolo Basket (Q)	4	3	1	349	274	+75	7	Second round	2 Dec	—	25 Nov	98–66
3	(Spanish Basketball Federation) Valencia Basket	4	2	2	310	283	+27	6	Second round	69–88	63–77	—	105–47
4	(Romanian Basketball Federation) CS Rapid București	4	0	4	228	407	−179	4	EuroCup Women	51–101	64–103	2 Dec	—

Updated to match(es) played on 3 November 2026. Source: EuroLeague Women
Legend: Blue = home team win; Red = away team win.
Rules for classification: 1) Points; 2) Points difference; 3) Points scored.
(Q) Qualified for the phase indicated

14 October 2026
20:00 (CEST)

Boxscore

Valencia Basket (Spanish Basketball Federation)	69–88	(Turkish Basketball Federation) Fenerbahçe Tarfin
Scoring by quarter: 12–27, 18–23, 21–18, 18–20
Pts: Takács-Kiss 12; Rebs: Flórez 5 Asts: Romero 4		Pts: Lacan 19; Rebs: Allemand, Betts 5 Asts: Meesseman, Allemand 5

Roig Arena, Valencia
Attendance: 3,069
Referees: Nataša Dragojević, Bogna Podkowińska, Laure Coanus

14 October 2026
19:00 (CEST)

Boxscore

Flammes Carolo Basket (French Federation of Basketball)	98–66	(Romanian Basketball Federation) CS Rapid București
Scoring by quarter: 18–9, 28–22, 32–21, 20–14
Pts: Love 21; Rebs: Strunc, Banaszak 7 Asts: Franchelin 13		Pts: Cuic, Páleníková 13; Rebs: Cuic 8 Asts: Delić 5

Guinguette Arena, Charleville-Mézières
Attendance: 2,034
Referees: Jelena Tomić, Svetlana Stoyanova, Romana Stojanović

21 October 2026
19:30 (EEST)

Boxscore

CS Rapid București (Romanian Basketball Federation)	51–101	(Turkish Basketball Federation) Fenerbahçe Tarfin
Scoring by quarter: 13–21, 8–35, 13–21, 17–24
Pts: Cuic 14; Rebs: Delić 6 Asts: Orban 4		Pts: Betts 16; Rebs: Betts 12; Asts: Anderson 5

Polyvalent Hall, Bucharest
Attendance: 1,000
Referees: Esperanza Mendoza, Ewa Matuszewska, Romana Rea Car

21 October 2026
20:00 (CEST)

Boxscore

Valencia Basket (Spanish Basketball Federation)	63–77	(French Federation of Basketball) Flammes Carolo Basket
Scoring by quarter: 23–23, 10–16, 16–21, 14–17
Pts: Carrera 10; Rebs: Flórez 9 Asts: Takács-Kiss, Flórez 3		Pts: Brochant 17; Rebs: Magassa, Banaszak 4 Asts: Franchelin 9

Roig Arena, Valencia
Attendance: 2,685
Referees: Özlem Yalman, Amalia Marchiș, Deividas Mačiulskis

28 October 2026
20:00 (TRT)

Boxscore

Fenerbahçe Tarfin (Turkish Basketball Federation)	81–71	(French Federation of Basketball) Flammes Carolo Basket
Scoring by quarter: 28–13, 18–13, 23–24, 12–21
Pts: Pouye 14; Rebs: Betts 10; Asts: Meesseman, Lacan 7		Pts: Love 17; Rebs: Love 9 Asts: Franchelin 9

Ülker Sports and Event Hall, Istanbul
Referees: Nataša Dragojević, Nemanja Vlahović, Suzana Vujicic

28 October 2026
20:00 (CET)

Boxscore

Valencia Basket (Spanish Basketball Federation)	105–47	(Romanian Basketball Federation) CS Rapid București
Scoring by quarter: 30–15, 24–7, 24–15, 27–10
Pts: Bibby 22; Rebs: three players 6 Asts: Peterson 6		Pts: Cuic 16; Rebs: Delić, Nan 7 Asts: Páleníková 5

Roig Arena, Valencia
Attendance: 2,657
Referees: Veronika Obertova, Pawel Pacek, Vladimir Zanev

3 November 2026
20:00 (TRT)

Boxscore

Fenerbahçe Tarfin (Turkish Basketball Federation)	71–73	(Spanish Basketball Federation) Valencia Basket
Scoring by quarter: 22–23, 20–14, 20–20, 9–16
Pts: Betts 16; Rebs: Betts 6 Asts: Meesseman 4		Pts: Peterson 21; Rebs: Carrera 11; Asts: Pueyo 3

Ülker Sports and Event Hall, Istanbul
Referees: Milita Stalausinskaitė, Mikheil Vartanov, Stefan Stefanov

3 November 2026
19:30 (EET)

Boxscore

CS Rapid București (Romanian Basketball Federation)	64–103	(French Federation of Basketball) Flammes Carolo Basket
Scoring by quarter: 15–34, 18–22, 13–23, 18–24
Pts: Cuic 32; Rebs: Cuic 6 Asts: Cuic 5		Pts: Clarke 19; Rebs: Brochant 9 Asts: Franchelin 12

Polyvalent Hall, Bucharest
Attendance: 85
Referees: Ivana Ivanovic, Sara Månsson, Luka Manojlovic

25 November 2026
20:00 (TRT)

Boxscore

Fenerbahçe Tarfin (Turkish Basketball Federation)	vs.	(Romanian Basketball Federation) CS Rapid București

Ülker Sports and Event Hall, Istanbul

25 November 2026
19:00 (CET)

Boxscore

Flammes Carolo Basket (French Federation of Basketball)	vs.	(Spanish Basketball Federation) Valencia Basket

Guinguette Arena, Charleville-Mézières

2 December 2026
19:00 (CET)

Boxscore

Flammes Carolo Basket (French Federation of Basketball)	vs.	(Turkish Basketball Federation) Fenerbahçe Tarfin

Guinguette Arena, Charleville-Mézières

2 December 2026
19:30 (EET)

Boxscore

CS Rapid București (Romanian Basketball Federation)	vs.	(Spanish Basketball Federation) Valencia Basket

Polyvalent Hall, Bucharest

=== Group D ===
Pos	Team	Pld	W	L	PF	PA	PD	Pts	Qualification	PRA	TAN	EKO	LUB
1	(Czech Basketball Federation) ZVVZ USK Praha	4	3	1	311	276	+35	7	Second round	—	76–55	80–65	25 Nov
2	(French Federation of Basketball) Tango Bourges Basket	4	3	1	307	300	+7	7	Second round	85–81	—	79–74	2 Dec
3	(Turkish Basketball Federation) Emlak Konut	4	1	3	303	305	−2	5	Second round	2 Dec	25 Nov	—	85–61
4	(Polish Basketball Federation) AZS UMCS Lublin	4	1	3	286	326	−40	5	EuroCup Women	71–74	69–88	85–79	—

Updated to match(es) played on 3 November 2026. Source: EuroLeague Women
Legend: Blue = home team win; Red = away team win.
Rules for classification: 1) Points; 2) Points difference; 3) Points scored.

14 October 2026
19:00 (CEST)

Boxscore

ZVVZ USK Praha (Czech Basketball Federation)	76–55	(French Federation of Basketball) Tango Bourges Basket
Scoring by quarter: 12–17, 22–17, 20–15, 22–6
Pts: Fraser 21; Rebs: Prosper 9 Asts: four players 3		Pts: C. Djaldi-Tabdi 16; Rebs: M. Djaldi-Tabdi 12; Asts: Méndez 4

Královka Arena, Prague
Attendance: 825
Referees: Milita Stalaučinskaitė, Amalia Marchiş, Maximilian Meiler

14 October 2026
19:00 (TRT)

Boxscore

Emlak Konut (Turkish Basketball Federation)	85–61	(Polish Basketball Federation) AZS UMCS Lublin
Scoring by quarter: 27–21, 20–18, 21–8, 17–14
Pts: Mavunga 29; Rebs: Kunaiyi-Akpannah 13; Asts: Lelik, Allen 7		Pts: Reese 16; Rebs: Rembiszewska, Reese 5 Asts: Wojtala 5

Başakşehir Gençlik ve Spor Tesisleri, Istanbul
Attendance: 500
Referees: Veronika Obertova, Nika Štampalija, Mikheil Vartanov

21 October 2026
18:00 (CEST)

Boxscore

AZS UMCS Lublin (Polish Basketball Federation)	71–74	(Czech Basketball Federation) ZVVZ USK Praha
Scoring by quarter: 19–21, 22–24, 16–8, 14–21
Pts: Treffers 16; Rebs: Treffers 9 Asts: Tadić 14		Pts: Bühner 17; Rebs: Fraser 7 Asts: Cazorla 6

Hala Mosir, Lublin
Attendance: 549
Referees: Jelena Tomić, Jordan Wallet, Amal Dahra

21 October 2026
20:00 (CEST)

Boxscore

Tango Bourges Basket (French Federation of Basketball)	79–74	(Turkish Basketball Federation) Emlak Konut
Scoring by quarter: 15–18, 21–24, 22–14, 21–18
Pts: Foppossi 22; Rebs: Thomas 7 Asts: Méndez 7		Pts: Mavunga 25; Rebs: Kunaiyi-Akpannah 15; Asts: Allen 7

Caisse d'Epargne Loire Centre - le Prado, Bourges
Attendance: 2,845
Referees: Ivana Ivanović, Ivan Iliev, Tom Dehondt

28 October 2026
19:00 (CET)

Boxscore

ZVVZ USK Praha (Czech Basketball Federation)	80–65	(Turkish Basketball Federation) Emlak Konut
Scoring by quarter: 19–9, 21–22, 20–17, 20–17
Pts: Astier, Toure 18; Rebs: Buhner 6 Asts: Astier 7		Pts: Kunaiyi-Akpannah 17; Rebs: Mavunga 12; Asts: Lelik 9

Královka Arena, Prague
Attendance: 795
Referees: Milita Stalaučinskaitė, Luka Manojlovic, Romana Rea Car

28 October 2026
18:00 (CET)

Boxscore

AZS UMCS Lublin (Polish Basketball Federation)	69–88	(French Federation of Basketball) Tango Bourges Basket
Scoring by quarter: 16–19, 19–36, 20–19, 14–14
Pts: Sellers 19; Rebs: Treffers 7 Asts: Tadić 7		Pts: Foppossi 16; Rebs: Duchet 8 Asts: Duchet 5

Hala Mosir, Lublin
Attendance: 515
Referees: Özlem Yalman, Sara Månsson, Denys Povorozniuk

3 November 2026
18:00 (CET)

Boxscore

AZS UMCS Lublin (Polish Basketball Federation)	85–79	(Turkish Basketball Federation) Emlak Konut
Scoring by quarter: 22–20, 24–19, 25–13, 14–27
Pts: Sellers 24; Rebs: Sellers 10; Asts: Tadić 9		Pts: Mavunga 26; Rebs: Kunaiyi-Akpannah 13; Asts: Allen 6

Hala Mosir, Lublin
Attendance: 612
Referees: Viola Györgyi, Marius Ciulin, Janis Rozenbergs

3 November 2026
20:00 (CET)

Boxscore

Tango Bourges Basket (French Federation of Basketball)	85–81	(Czech Basketball Federation) ZVVZ USK Praha
Scoring by quarter: 23–22, 25–26, 19–19, 18–14
Pts: Duchet 20; Rebs: Thomas 10; Asts: Duchet 7		Pts: Cazorla 19; Rebs: Bühner 11; Asts: Astier 5

Caisse d'Epargne Loire Centre - le Prado, Bourges
Attendance: 2,920
Referees: Esperanza Mendoza, Bogna Podkowińska, Jelena Tomic

25 November 2026
19:00 (CET)

Boxscore

ZVVZ USK Praha (Czech Basketball Federation)	vs.	(Polish Basketball Federation) AZS UMCS Lublin

Královka Arena, Prague

25 November 2026
19:00 (TRT)

Boxscore

Emlak Konut (Turkish Basketball Federation)	vs.	(French Federation of Basketball) Tango Bourges Basket

Başakşehir Gençlik ve Spor Tesisleri, Istanbul

2 December 2026
19:00 (TRT)

Boxscore

Emlak Konut (Turkish Basketball Federation)	vs.	(Czech Basketball Federation) ZVVZ USK Praha

Başakşehir Gençlik ve Spor Tesisleri, Istanbul

2 December 2026
20:00 (CET)

Boxscore

Tango Bourges Basket (French Federation of Basketball)	vs.	(Polish Basketball Federation) AZS UMCS Lublin

Caisse d'Epargne Loire Centre - le Prado, Bourges

== Matchday reports ==
Reference
Matchday 1
Matchday 2
Matchday 3
Matchday 4

== See also ==
- 2026–27 EuroLeague Women
- 2026–27 EuroLeague Women Play-ins
- 2027 EuroLeague Women Final Six
- 2026–27 EuroCup Women
- 2026 FIBA Europe SuperCup Women
- 2026–27 EuroLeague Women qualification round
- 2026–27 EuroCup Women qualification round
- 2026–27 EuroCup Women regular season
- 2026–27 EuroCup Women knockout stage
