= Alaina Coates =

American basketball player (born 1995)

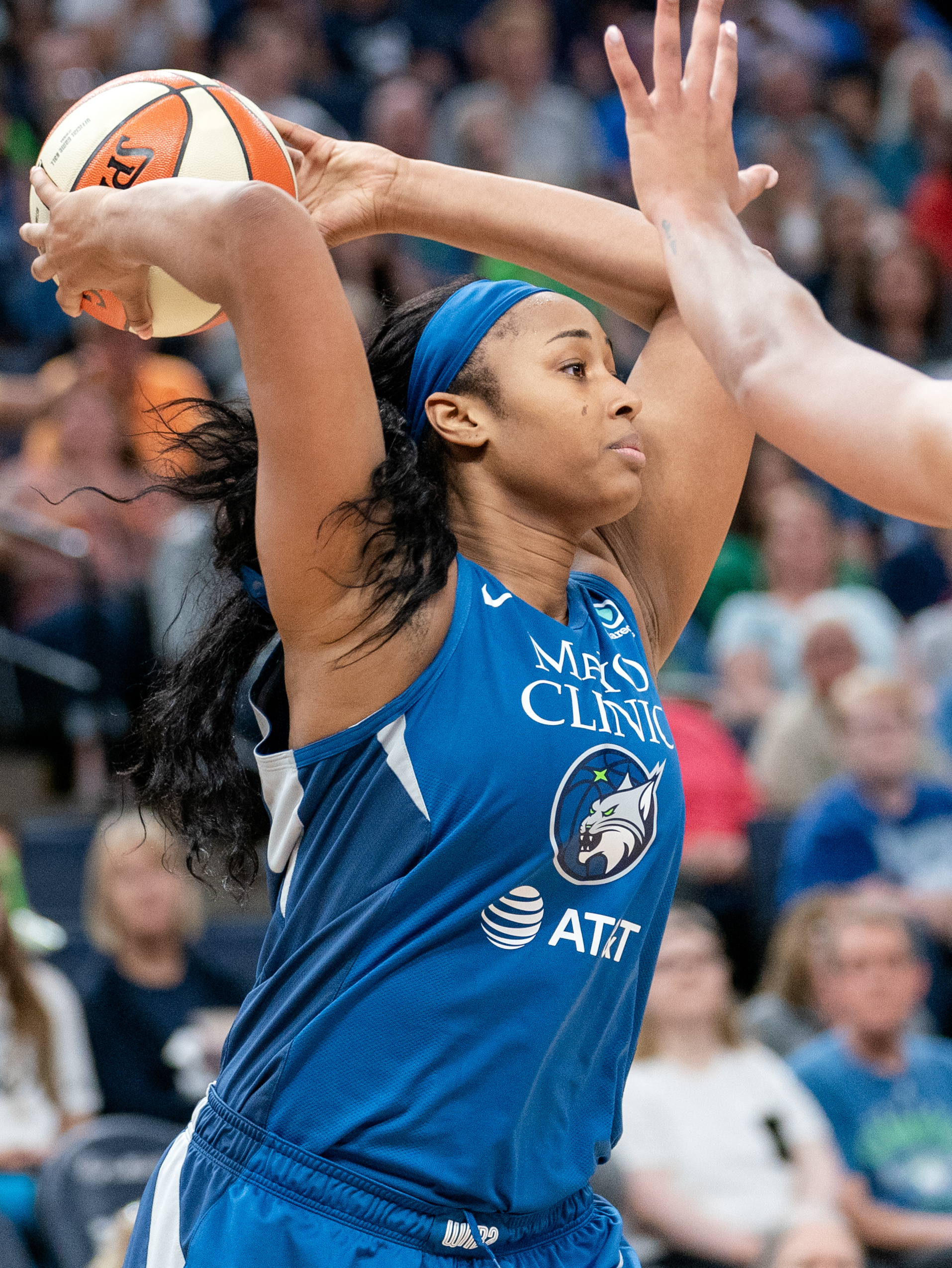
- Coates with the Minnesota Lynx in 2019

Personal information
- Born: April 7, 1995 (age 31) Irmo, South Carolina, U.S.
- Listed height: 6 ft 4 in (1.93 m)
- Listed weight: 225 lb (102 kg)

Career information
- High school: Dutch Fork (Irmo, South Carolina)
- College: South Carolina (2013–2017)
- WNBA draft: 2017: 1st round, 2nd overall pick
- Drafted by: Chicago Sky
- Playing career: 2017–present
- Position: Center

Career history
- 2018: Sopron Basket
- 2018: Chicago Sky
- 2018–2019: Zhejiang Far East
- 2019: Minnesota Lynx
- 2019: Atlanta Dream
- 2020: Hatay Büyükşehir Belediyespor
- 2020: Washington Mystics
- 2020–2021: Ramat HaSharon
- 2021–2022: Nesibe Aydın GSK
- 2022: Indiana Fever
- 2022: Galatasaray
- 2023: Phoenix Mercury
- 2023: Las Vegas Aces
- 2023–2024: Nesibe Aydın GSK
- 2024: BC Castelnuovo Scrivia

Career highlights
- WNBA champion (2023); NCAA champion (2017); 2× First-team All-SEC (2016, 2017); 2× SEC All-Defensive Team (2015, 2017); 2× Second-team All-SEC (2014, 2015); SEC All-Freshman Team (2014); SEC Co-Sixth Player of the Year (2014); SEC Freshman of the Year (2014); Gatorade South Carolina Player of the Year (2013); McDonald's All-American (2013); South Carolina Miss Basketball (2013)
- Stats at WNBA.com
- Stats at Basketball Reference
Medals
Women's basketball
Representing the United States
Pan American Games
Silver medal – second place	2015 Toronto	Team

Alaina Denise Coates (born April 7, 1995) is an American professional basketball player who is a free agent. She played college basketball for the University of South Carolina.

== Early life ==
In high school, Coates was both a McDonald's and Parade All-American. She was chosen as the 2013 Gatorade South Carolina Player of the Year, South Carolina Basketball Coaches Association (SCBCA) Class 4A Player of the Year, Charlotte Observer South Carolina Miss Basketball, and became a three-time SCBCA Class 4A all-state selection.

During her senior season, she posted 20.1 points, 11.6 rebounds and 3.6 blocks per game while leading her team to back-to-back state championships (including an undefeated 29–0 season in 2012–13.)

== College career ==
Heavily recruited by power programs, she was ranked the 28th overall player as part of a high-profile 2013 recruiting class. After receiving offers from Tennessee, and Georgia, she eventually chose South Carolina to play for her hometown team. She went on to become a 4x All-SEC player, and All-American. Coates played a crucial part in helping South Carolina become a national powerhouse. In her senior season, Coates injured her ankle, which caused her to miss South Carolina's SEC Tourney & National Championship run. Coates finished the season averaging 13.4 ppg and 11.1 rpg.

== Professional career ==
=== WNBA ===
==== Chicago Sky ====
After her senior season, Coates was drafted second overall by the Chicago Sky in the 2017 WNBA draft. In April 2017, it was announced that Coates would miss part of the 2017 WNBA season following ankle surgery. However, a timetable for her return still wasn't determined and Coates would end up missing the entire season. In February 2018, Coates officially signed with the Sky. She made her career debut on May 19, 2018, in the Sky's season opener against the Indiana Fever, she scored 5 points in 12 minutes of play in an 82–64 victory. On July 3, 2018, Coates scored in double digits for the first time with 10 points in 16 minutes of play during a 108–85 loss to the Dallas Wings. By the end of the season, the Sky finished 13–21, missing out on the playoffs.

==== Minnesota Lynx ====
On May 21, 2019, Coates was traded to the Minnesota Lynx in exchange for a 2020 third-round draft pick. On July 14, 2019, Coates was waived by the Minnesota Lynx.

==== Atlanta Dream ====
On July 17, 2019, Coates signed with the Atlanta Dream.

==== Washington Mystics ====
Coates signed with the Washington Mystics on June 29, 2020, and made her debut for the team on the opening day of the season.

==== Indiana Fever ====
On February 7, 2023, Coates signed with the Indiana Fever on a training camp contract. Coates was temporarily suspended on May 5, due to overseas commitments, and was activated May 11. The Fever waived Coates on June 7, 2023.

==== Phoenix Mercury ====
On June 27, 2023, Coates signed a Hardship Contract with the Phoenix Mercury. Coates appeared in 2 games for the Mercury and was released from the hardship contract on June 29, 2023.

==== Las Vegas Aces ====
On August 2, 2023, Coates signed a 7-Day Contract with the Las Vegas Aces. Coates stayed with Aces following the 7-Day, signing a 2nd and 3rd 7-Day Contract with Las Vegas. After her 3rd 7-Day Contract, Coates signed a rest-of-season hardship contract to remain with the Aces.

=== Overseas ===
In October 2018, Coates signed with Zhejiang Far East of the Chinese League for the 2018-19 off-season.

Coates played for Nesibe Aydın GSK of the Turkish Women's Basketball Super League (TKBL) in the 2021–2022 season.

On October 5, 2022, she signed with Galatasaray.

Coates returned to Nesibe Aydın GSK for the 2023–2024 season.

She played for BC Castelnuovo Scrivia of the Lega Basket Femminile from September to December 2024.

== Personal life ==
Alaina is the daughter of Gary and Pamela Coates. She has an older brother, Gary. Her uncle, Ben Coates, is retired from the NFL and was a member of the Baltimore Ravens first Super Bowl. While at South Carolina, she majored in sociology. In March 2018, Coates's father died of cardiac arrest.

== Career statistics ==
Legend
GP	Games played	GS	Games started	MPG	Minutes per game	RPG	Rebounds per game
APG	Assists per game	SPG	Steals per game	BPG	Blocks per game	PPG	Points per game
TO	Turnovers per game	FG%	Field-goal percentage	3P%	3-point field-goal percentage	FT%	Free-throw percentage
**Bold**	Career best	°	League leader

=== College ===
Year	Team	GP	MPG	FG%	3P%	FT%	RPG	APG	SPG	BPG	Points	PPG
2013–14	South Carolina	**29**	19.2	.630	.000	.658	7.9	0.3	0.6	**2.0**	417	12.2
2014–15	South Carolina	28	20.7	.526	.000	**.705**	8.1	0.8	0.6	1.5	399	10.6
2015–16	South Carolina	**29**	26.7	.655	.000	.551	10.1	1.0	1.1	1.3	**425**	11.7
2016–17	South Carolina	27	**27.5**	**.670**	.000	.653	**11.1**	**1.6**	**1.2**	1.4	362	**13.4**
Career	South Carolina	113	23.5	.622	.000	.644	9.3	0.9	0.9	1.6	1603	12.0

=== WNBA ===
†	Denotes seasons in which Coates won a WNBA championship

==== Regular season ====
Year	Team	GP	GS	MPG	FG%	3P%	FT%	RPG	APG	SPG	BPG	TO	PPG
2018	Chicago	**32**	0	**11.4**	.568	—	.625	**3.2**	0.4	0.2	0.2	0.5	3.4
2019	Minnesota	14	0	6.6	.484	—	.625	2.4	0.1	0.2	0.4	0.4	2.5
2019	Atlanta	9	0	8.3	.643	—	.538	3.0	0.1	0.2	**0.7**	0.4	2.8
2020	Washington	20	0	9.9	.529	—	.538	2.8	**0.5**	0.4	0.2	0.6	2.5
2022	Indiana	8	0	9.4	.636	—	**.933**	2.0	0.3	0.3	0.4	0.6	**3.5**
2023	Phoenix	2	0	2.5	**1.000**	—	—	0.0	0.0	**0.5**	0.0	**0.0**	1.0
2023^{†}	Las Vegas	10	0	3.0	.800	—	.250	1.0	0.0	0.2	0.0	0.7	0.9
Career	5 years, 7 teams	95	0	8.8	.565	—	.623	2.6	0.3	0.2	0.3	0.5	2.7

==== Postseason ====
Year	Team	GP	GS	MPG	FG%	3P%	FT%	RPG	APG	SPG	BPG	TO	PPG
2020	Washington	1	0	**4.0**	.000	—	—	**1.0**	0.0	0.0	0.0	**0.0**	0.0
2023^{†}	Las Vegas	**6**	0	1.8	**1.000**	—	—	0.8	0.0	**0.2**	0.0	0.2	**0.3**
Career	2 years, 2 teams	7	0	2.1	.500	—	—	0.9	0.0	0.1	0.0	0.3	0.3
