= Roche Vendée Basket Club =

Roche Vendee
- Leagues: La Boulangère Wonderligue
- Founded: 1997
- Arena: Salle des Oudairies (capacity: 2,500)
- Location: La Roche-sur-Yon, France
- Team colors: Red and White
- President: (France) David Cottreau
- Head coach: (France) Emmanuel Body
- Website: https://www.rvbc.fr/

The Roche Vendée Basket Club is a French professional women's basketball club from La Roche-sur-Yon, that currently plays in the La Boulangère Wonderligue (French's first division for women's basketball).

== Honours ==
- Ligue Feminine 2 de Basketball
  - Winners (1): 2017

== Players ==
=== Current roster ===
Note: Flags indicate national team eligibility at FIBA-sanctioned events. Players may hold other non-FIBA nationalities not displayed.

Roche Vendee roster
Players
Coaches

| Pos. | No. | Nat. | Name | Ht. | Age |
|---|---|---|---|---|---|
| C | 3 | (France) | Gaye, Aby | 1.95 m (6 ft 5 in) | 30 – 3 February 1995 |
| SF | 5 | (United States) | Phillips, Jade | 1.80 m (5 ft 11 in) | 27 – 20 April 1997 |
| SG | 10 | (France) | Peytour-Raison, Emma | 1.72 m (5 ft 8 in) | 24 – 11 August 2000 |
| PG | 21 | (United States) | McCarty-Williams, Brooke | 1.63 m (5 ft 4 in) | 29 – 2 October 1995 |
| PF | 23 | (Cameroon) | Silatsa, Carine | 1.86 m (6 ft 1 in) | 26 – 28 April 1998 |
| SG | 27 | (France) | Preneau, Louise | 1.78 m (5 ft 10 in) | 21 – 27 November 2003 |
| PF | 28 | (Morocco) | Ousfar, Sarah | 1.83 m (6 ft 0 in) | 31 – 28 July 1993 |
| SG | 75 | (France) | Gomis, Vaciana | 1.73 m (5 ft 8 in) | 22 – 20 December 2002 |
| C | 77 | (Mali) | Balayera, Diana | 1.91 m (6 ft 3 in) | 29 – 28 January 1996 |
| C | 95 | (France) | Bawara, Ashley | | 20 – 1 January 2005 |

Head coach

- (France) Emmanuel Body

Assistant coach(es)

- (France) Quentin Boullet

Legend

- (C) Team captain
- Injured

- Roster
Updated: 13 November 2024
