= BC Castelnuovo Scrivia =

BCC Derthona
- Leagues: Serie A1
- Founded: 1986
- Arena: Cittadella dello Sport
- Location: Castelnuovo Scrivia, Italy
- Team colors: Red and White
- President: (Italy) Maurizio Sacchi
- Head coach: (Italy) Orazio Cutugno
- Website: www.bccastelnuovo.com
Home	Away

The Basket Club Castelnuovo, also known as BCC Derthona Basket, is a professional women's basketball club based in Castelnuovo Scrivia, Italy. The team was founded in 2018. It currently plays in the Serie A1. In 2023, the partnership with Derthona Basket begins.

== Honours ==
- Serie A2
  - Champions (1): 2023–24

== Players ==
=== Current roster ===
Note: Flags indicate national team eligibility at FIBA-sanctioned events. Players may hold other non-FIBA nationalities not displayed.

BCC Derthona Basket roster
Players
Coaches

Pos.	No.	Nat.	Name	Ht.	Age
PG	0	(Italy)	Dotto, Caterina	1.68 m (5 ft 6 in)	33 – 17 March 1993
SG	3	(Italy)	Marangoni, Sofia	1.77 m (5 ft 10 in)	31 – 14 January 1995
G/F	4	(Sweden)	Fontaine, Nathalie	1.88 m (6 ft 2 in)	33 – 3 October 1993
PF	7	(Croatia)	Premasunac, Nina	1.87 m (6 ft 2 in)	33 – 25 October 1992
G	10	(Italy)	Leonardi, Francesca	1.86 m (6 ft 1 in)	24 – 21 August 2002
F	12	(Italy)	Lokoka, Alexandra	1.84 m (6 ft 0 in)	18 – 9 February 2008
F	13	(Italy)	Arado, Arianna	1.86 m (6 ft 1 in)	22 – 27 June 2004
G	16	(Italy)	Cocuzza, Carlotta	1.70 m (5 ft 7 in)	19 – 23 July 2007
PG	30	(Italy)	Attura, Beatrice	1.70 m (5 ft 7 in)	31 – 5 November 1994
G	33	(Italy)	Melchiori, Francesca	1.74 m (5 ft 9 in)	31 – 14 January 1995
SF	41	(Italy)	Penna, Elisa	1.88 m (6 ft 2 in)	30 – 13 November 1995
C	44	(Italy)	Gatti, Valentina	1.93 m (6 ft 4 in)	37 – 6 December 1988
C	81	(United States)	Coates, Alaina	1.93 m (6 ft 4 in)	31 – 7 April 1995

Head coach

- (Italy) Orazio Cutugno

Assistant coach(es)

- (Italy) Cristian Braidotti
- (Italy) Daniel Altin

Legend

- (C) Team captain
- Injured

- Roster
Updated: 26 November 2024
