= Panserraikos (women's basketball) =

The Panserraikos women's Basketball Club is a Greek sports club active in the city of Serres, in the homonymous regional unit. It was officially founded on May 31, 1964, initially as a football club. Its emblem depicts the Lion of Amphipolis, a famous funerary monument from the 4th century BC.

The club's women's basketball department, which began operating in 1983, has the legal form of an amateur club. Its headquarters is the Indoor Gymnasium of the Municipality. Serres (also known as the Agioi Anargyroi Valley Indoor Stadium), with a capacity of 1,000 spectators. It has both an adult section and infrastructure sections for younger athletes.

Its athletes compete in red and white.
