= Landerneau Bretagne Basket =

French women's basketball team

- League: La Boulangère Wonderligue
- Founded: 2011
- Arena: La Cimenterie (capacity: 2,300)
- Location: Landerneau, France
- Team colors: White , Purple and Green
- President: (France) Erwan Croguennec
- Head coach: (France) Wani Muganguzi
Home	Away

Landerneau Bretagne Basket is a French professional women's basketball club from Landerneau, France, that takes part to the professional French league for the La Boulangère Wonderligue (French's first division for women's basketball).

== Titles ==
- Ligue Feminine 2 de Basketball

Champions (1): 2017–18

== Roster ==
=== Current roster ===
Note: Flags indicate national team eligibility at FIBA-sanctioned events. Players may hold other non-FIBA nationalities not displayed.

Landerneau Bretagne Basket roster
Players
Coaches

Pos.	No.	Nat.	Name	Ht.	Age
PF	0	(England)	Rafiu, Susie	1.85 m (6 ft 1 in)	22 – 17 December 2003
PG	4	(France)	Cariou, Emma	1.67 m (5 ft 6 in)	18 – 4 September 2008
C	5	(Guinea)	Kaba, Masseny	1.93 m (6 ft 4 in)	27 – 15 December 1998
SG	6	(France)	Heriaud, Caroline	1.65 m (5 ft 5 in)	29 – 22 December 1996
PG	7	(France)	Jakovljevic, Hélène	1.77 m (5 ft 10 in)	25 – 5 October 2000
SG	10	(United States)	Mabrey, Dara	1.70 m (5 ft 7 in)	26 – 21 December 1999
SG	12	(France)	Albert, Janice	1.80 m (5 ft 11 in)	18 – 16 October 2007
SG	14	(United States)	Turner, Harmoni	1.78 m (5 ft 10 in)	24 – 4 October 2001
SF	18	(France)	Yerbé, Manaëlle	1.83 m (6 ft 0 in)	22 – 18 August 2004
PF	22	(France)	Komara, Hawa	1.82 m (6 ft 0 in)	23 – 22 August 2003
PF	24	(France)	Selle, Mathilde	1.90 m (6 ft 3 in)	20 – 7 April 2006
PG	25	(France)	Tsobgny, Rebecca	1.65 m (5 ft 5 in)	23 – 12 June 2003
PF	26	(France)	Boudhil, Naëlle	1.87 m (6 ft 2 in)	19 – 10 May 2007

Head coach

- (France) Wani Muganguzi

Assistant coach(es)

- (France) Bérenger Silliau
- (France) Léo Bouteiller

Legend

- (C) Team captain
- Injured

- Roster
Updated: September 29, 2026
