= Charnay Basket Bourgogne Sud =

French women's basketball team

Charnay
- Leagues: La Boulangère Wonderligue
- Founded: 1957
- Arena: The Cosec (capacity: 1,200)
- Location: Charnay les Macon, France
- Team colors: Pink and Black
- President: (France) Jean-François Jaillet
- Head coach: (France) Stephane Leite
- Website: https://charnaybasket.fr/

The Charnay Basket Bourgogne Sud is a French women's basketball club that takes part to the professional French league for the La Boulangère Wonderligue (French's first division for women's basketball). The Charnay Basket Bourgogne Sud is a professional women's basketball club based in Charnay les Macon.

== Titles ==
- Ligue Feminine 2 de Basketball

Champions (2): 2013–14, 2022–23

== Players ==
=== Current roster ===
Note: Flags indicate national team eligibility at FIBA-sanctioned events. Players may hold other non-FIBA nationalities not displayed.

Charnay Basket Bourgogne Sud (La Boulangère Wonderligue) roster
Players
Coaches

Pos.	No.	Nat.	Name	Ht.	Age
PF	3	(France)	Gaye, Astou	1.88 m (6 ft 2 in)	27 – 22 January 1998
G/F	4	(Nigeria)	Balogun, Elizabeth	1.85 m (6 ft 1 in)	24 – 9 September 2000
PG	7	(France)	Kiavi, Elyah	1.74 m (5 ft 9 in)	21 – 11 August 2003
SG	8	(Cameroon)	Akoa Makani, Monique	1.79 m (5 ft 10 in)	24 – 4 February 2001
G/F	9	(France)	Daramy, Mariama	1.80 m (5 ft 11 in)	22 – 11 August 2002
PF	14	(Latvia)	Strautmane, Paula	1.85 m (6 ft 1 in)	28 – 23 March 1997
PF	20	(United States)	Thomas, Shakayla	1.82 m (6 ft 0 in)	29 – 5 May 1996
PG	21	(France)	Desset, Nathalie	1.76 m (5 ft 9 in)	20 – 21 March 2005
G	23	(Australia)	Garrick, Madeleine	1.80 m (5 ft 11 in)	33 – 1 April 1992
PG	25	(France)	Chabrier, Coralie	1.69 m (5 ft 7 in)	25 – 28 April 2000
C	33	(France)	Djaldi-Tabdi, Maeva	1.87 m (6 ft 2 in)	26 – 3 December 1998

Head coach

- (France) Stephane Leite

Assistant coach(es)

- (France) Fabian Unovis
- (France) Olivier Christophe

Legend

- (C) Team captain
- Injured

- Roster
Updated: 1 November 2024
