= Saarlouis Royals =

German sports club

- Leagues: Damen Bundesligen
- Arena: Stadtgartenhalle, Saarlouis
- Location: Saarlouis, Germany
- Team colors: Black, Yellow
- Head coach: Matīss Rožlapa
- Website: royals-saarlouis.de
Home	Away

TV 1872 Saarlouis is a German sports club from Saarlouis best known for its women's basketball team, also known as Saarlouis Royals. Royals won two national leagues and three national cups between 2008 and 2010, and reached the 2010 Eurocup's semifinals. However, the team collapsed in 2012, ending last.

== Titles ==
- Bundesliga
  - 2009, 2010
- BBL-Pokal
  - 2008, 2009, 2010
