= Czech Basketball Federation =

Sports governing body in the Czech Republic

- Sport: Basketball
- Jurisdiction: Czech Republic
- Abbreviation: ČBF
- Founded: 1993
- Affiliation: FIBA
- Regional affiliation: FIBA Europe
- Headquarters: Prague

Official website
- www.cz.basketball
- (Czech Republic)

The Czech Basketball Federation (Czech: Česká basketbalová federace), also known as ČBF, is the governing body of basketball in the Czech Republic. It was founded after the dissolution of the unified state in 1993, with the Slovakia national basketball team continuing as the successor of the Czechoslovak team.

They organize national competitions in the Czech Republic for the Czech men's national team and Czech women's national team.

The top level professional league is the National Basketball League.

== See also ==
- Czech national basketball team
- Czech women's national basketball team
