= Chartres Basket Feminin =

Chartres Basket
- Leagues: La Boulangère Wonderligue
- Founded: 1960
- Arena: Halle Jean Cochet (capacity: 1,200)
- Location: Chartres, France
- Team colors: Blue and Dark Blue
- President: (France) Jean-Eric Chevalier
- Head coach: (France) Benoit Marty
- Website: https://www.ccmbf.fr/

The Chartres Basket Feminin is a French professional women's basketball club from Chartres.that currently plays in the La Boulangère Wonderligue (French's first division for women's basketball).

== Honours ==
- Ligue Feminine 2 de Basketball
  - Winners (1): 2024

== Players ==
=== Current roster ===
Note: Flags indicate national team eligibility at FIBA-sanctioned events. Players may hold other non-FIBA nationalities not displayed.

Chartres Basket (La Boulangère Wonderligue) roster
Players
Coaches

Pos.	No.	Nat.	Name	Ht.	Age
CG	2	(France)	Colas, Stella	1.75 m (5 ft 9 in)	18 – 5 October 2006
G	5	(France)	Bruce, Nadou	1.76 m (5 ft 9 in)	20 – 31 January 2005
F	6	(France)	Elenga, Sophia	1.84 m (6 ft 0 in)	29 – 1 June 1995
SF	7	(France)	Legrand, Clarisse	1.83 m (6 ft 0 in)	28 – 28 April 1996
SG	9	(Sweden)	Eldebrink, Frida	1.74 m (5 ft 9 in)	37 – 4 January 1988
PF	12	(United States)	Cooper, Kendall	1.93 m (6 ft 4 in)	29 – 19 August 1995
PG	21	(France)	Marie, Elise	1.64 m (5 ft 5 in)	29 – 22 July 1995
C	24	(France)	Niare, Nahan	1.90 m (6 ft 3 in)	23 – 15 February 2002
PF	26	(France)	Mahoutou, Eve	1.80 m (5 ft 11 in)	23 – 26 March 2001
C	27	(France)	Le Seyec, Rosanne	1.98 m (6 ft 6 in)	21 – 5 March 2004
SG	30	(France)	Debaut, Marine	1.70 m (5 ft 7 in)	31 – 9 March 1994
PF	33	(Nigeria)	Enabosi, Nicole	1.83 m (6 ft 0 in)	27 – 26 March 1997

Head coach

- (France) Benoit Marty

Assistant coach(es)

- (France) Marie-Julie Levant
- (France) Antoine Metz

Legend

- (C) Team captain
- Injured

- Roster
Updated: 14 November 2024
