= 2018–19 Liga Națională (women's basketball) =

Romanian women's basketball tournament

Liga Națională
- Season: 2018–19
- Teams: 13

Finals
- Champions: Sepsi SIC
- Runners-up: Satu Mare
- Third place: ICIM Arad
- Fourth place: Olimpia Brașov

The 2018–19 Liga Națională season is the 69th season of the Liga Națională, the highest professional basketball league in Romania. Sepsi SIC is the defending champion.

== Competition format ==
The Romanian Basketball Federation agreed a change in the competition format for the 2018–19 season:

- 13 teams (divided into 2 value groups: A and B) played the regular season, consisting in a double-legged round robin format.
  - Group A consist of the top 6 ranked teams from the 2017–18 Liga Națională.
  - Group B consist of the 9th place from the 2017–18 Liga Națională and top 6 ranked teams from the 2017–18 Liga I.
- At the end of the regular season, teams are split into four groups (Red, Yellow, Blue and Green).
  - Red Group consist of the Group A teams and the winner of the Group B.
  - Yellow Group consist of the other teams from Group B, ranked 2–7.
- All teams from the Red Group (from 1st to 7th place) and the winner of the Yellow Group will join the play-offs. In this knockout stage, quarterfinals and semifinals will be played with a best-of-five-games format.
  - To decide the teams ranked between 5th and 8th place will be used the best-of-three-games format.
  - The rest of the teams from the Yellow, Blue and Green Groups (16 teams) will form 2 groups of 8 teams and will play to decide the final rankings.
- Liga I was dissolved, so no team will relegate.

== Team changes ==
Promoted from Liga I

- CSM Târgoviște
- Phoenix Constanța
- U CSM Oradea
- Rapid București
- Agronomia București
- KSE Târgu Secuiesc

Relegated to Liga I

- —

=== Excluded teams ===
SCM Timișoara withdrew due to financial problems.

CSU Alba Iulia withdrew due to organizational problems.

=== Renamed teams ===
BC Sirius was moved to the sports club of Municipality of Târgu Mureș and was renamed as CSM Târgu Mureș.

CSBT Alexandria was moved to the sports club of Municipality of Alexandria and was renamed as CSM Alexandria.

== Teams ==
=== Group A ===
Location of teams in 2018–19 Liga Națională (Group A)

Team	City	Arena	Capacity
CSM	Satu Mare	Ecaterina Both Arena	400
CSM	Târgoviște	Sala Sporturilor	2,000
ICIM	Arad	Victoria Sports Hall	1,500
Olimpia CSU	Brașov	D.P. Colibași	1,700
Sepsi SIC	Sfântu Gheorghe	Arena Sepsi	3,000
Universitatea	Cluj Napoca	Polyvalent Hall / Horia Demian	7,308 / 2,525

=== Group B ===
Location of teams in 2018–19 Liga Națională (Group B)

Team	City	Arena	Capacity
CSM	Alexandria	Dimitrie Ghica	900
Agronomia	București	Arena de Baschet	350
CSM	Târgu Mureș	Sala Sporturilor	2,000
KSE	Târgu Secuiesc	Sala Sporturilor	200
Phoenix	Constanța	Sala Sporturilor	1,500
Rapid	București	Rapid	1,500
U CSM	Oradea	Arena Antonio Alexe	2,000

== Regular season ==
=== Group A ===
Pos	Team	Pld	W	L	PF	PA	PD	Pts	Qualification
1	Sepsi SIC	10	10	0	835	618	+217	18 (Note: Sepsi SIC were deducted 2 points because it did not participate in enough 3x3 basketball tournaments.)	Qualification to Red Group
2	Satu Mare	10	7	3	710	642	+68	17	Qualification to Red Group
3	Olimpia Brașov	10	5	5	752	818	−66	15	Qualification to Red Group
4	ICIM Arad	10	4	6	673	677	−4	14	Qualification to Red Group
5	Târgoviște	10	4	6	698	747	−49	14	Qualification to Red Group
6	Universitatea Cluj	10	0	10	604	770	−166	10	Qualification to Red Group

Source: Romanian Basketball Federation

==== Results ====
Home \ Away	ARD	OLI	STM	SIC	TGV	UCJ
ICIM Arad	—	85–73	52–66	58–68	78–65	66–49
Olimpia Brașov	87–76	—	80–74	71–84	72–91	84–70
Satu Mare	74–59	91–56	—	60–64	76–62	85–65
Sepsi SIC	68–58	96–57	93–54	—	101–69	77–56
Târgoviște	71–63	80–92	57–60	70–87	—	60–51
Universitatea Cluj	56–78	71–80	54–70	65–97	67–73	—

Updated to match(es) played on 19 December 2018. Source: Romanian Basketball Federation
Legend: Blue = home team win; Red = away team win.

=== Group B ===
Pos	Team	Pld	W	L	PF	PA	PD	Pts	Qualification
1	Phoenix Constanța	12	11	1	828	597	+231	22 (Note: Phoenix Constanța was deducted 1 point because it did not participate in enough 3x3 basketball tournaments.)	Qualification to Red Group
2	Oradea	12	9	3	724	639	+85	20 (Note: Oradea was deducted 1 point because it did not participate in enough 3x3 basketball tournaments.)	Qualification to Yellow Group
3	Rapid București	12	7	5	785	738	+47	19	Qualification to Yellow Group
4	Târgu Mureș	12	7	5	743	767	−24	19	Qualification to Yellow Group
5	KSE Târgu Secuiesc	12	4	8	715	731	−16	16	Qualification to Yellow Group
6	Alexandria	12	2	10	615	772	−157	14	Qualification to Yellow Group
7	Agronomia București	12	2	10	688	854	−166	14	Qualification to Yellow Group

Source: Romanian Basketball Federation

==== Results ====
Home \ Away	AGR	ALX	KSE	ORA	PHX	RAP	TGM
Agronomia București	—	61–58	50–66	55–81	68–75	60–59	55–77
Alexandria	72–65	—	61–50	62–77	50–74	52–77	49–57
KSE Târgu Secuiesc	70–53	64–41	—	82–57	42–69	63–74	73–75
Oradea	73–43	61–40	57–46	—	43–77	70–73	58–53
Phoenix Constanța	73–55	66–53	71–53	0–20	—	73–57	73–61
Rapid București	73–59	61–43	59–49	63–65	52–84	—	68–74
Târgu Mureș	77–64	59–46	64–57	45–62	55–93	46–69	—

Updated to match(es) played on 19 December 2018. Source: Romanian Basketball Federation
Legend: Blue = home team win; Red = away team win.

== Second stage ==
=== Red Group ===
Pos	Team	Pld	W	L	PF	PA	PD	Pts	Qualification
1	Sepsi SIC	22	21	1	1860	1291	+569	41 (Note: Sepsi SIC were deducted 2 points because it did not participate in enough 3x3 basketball tournaments.)	Qualification to Play-offs
2	Satu Mare	22	16	6	1682	1385	+297	38	Qualification to Play-offs
3	Olimpia Brașov	22	10	12	1570	1719	−149	32	Qualification to Play-offs
4	ICIM Arad	22	9	13	1490	1509	−19	31	Qualification to Play-offs
5	Târgoviște	22	9	13	1414	1572	−158	31	Qualification to Play-offs
6	Phoenix Constanța	24	14	10	1546	1459	+87	26 (Note: Phoenix Constanța was deducted 1 point and also entered in the Red Group only with half of the points won in the Group B.)	Qualification to Play-offs
7	Universitatea Cluj	22	4	18	1376	1772	−396	26	Qualification to Play-offs

Source: Romanian Basketball Federation

==== Results ====
Home \ Away	ARD	OLI	PHX	STM	SIC	TGV	UCJ
ICIM Arad	—	72–82	75–48	70–65	54–92	61–64	88–62
Olimpia Brașov	53–70	—	74–60	49–94	53–91	75–59	88–72
Phoenix Constanța	71–63	57–72	—	52–70	41–81	43–58	72–53
Satu Mare	78–62	90–79	98–70	—	76–51	82–41	105–41
Sepsi SIC	91–62	87–58	82–60	82–58	—	90–54	104–54
Târgoviște	52–70	69–61	50–63	78–74	49–78	—	87–71
Universitatea Cluj	74–70	80–74	86–81	68–82	54–96	57–55	—

Updated to match(es) played on 23 March 2019. Source: Romanian Basketball Federation
Legend: Blue = home team win; Red = away team win.

=== Yellow Group ===
Pos	Team	Pld	W	L	PF	PA	PD	Pts	Qualification
1	Târgu Mureș	22	14	8	1426	1341	+85	36 (Note: Târgu Mureș was ineligible to qualify for the play-offs being a team new founded.)	Qualification to Play-out
2	Oradea	22	11	11	1236	1325	−89	32 (Note: Oradea was deducted 1 point because it did not participate in enough 3x3 basketball tournaments.)	Qualification to Play-offs
3	Rapid București	22	14	8	1501	1371	+130	31 (Note: Rapid București were deducted 5 points due to youth squads irregulations.)	Qualification to Play-out
4	Alexandria	22	6	16	1194	1372	−178	28	Qualification to Play-out
5	Agronomia București	22	6	16	1307	1480	−173	28	Qualification to Play-out
6	KSE Târgu Secuiesc	22	10	12	1341	1347	−6	27 (Note: KSE Târgu Secuiesc were deducted 5 points due to youth squads irregulations.)	Qualification to Play-out

Source: Romanian Basketball Federation

==== Results ====
Home \ Away	AGR	ALX	KSE	ORA	RAP	TGM
Agronomia București	—	50–47	83–64	76–82	60–69	59–64
Alexandria	60–54	—	65–63	70–43	69–77	53–42
KSE Târgu Secuiesc	59–43	69–53	—	60–44	48–82	75–61
Oradea	43–69	65–54	44–67	—	42–61	33–70
Rapid București	64–66	68–63	69–75	84–54	—	50–68
Târgu Mureș	74–59	69–45	72–46	75–62	88–92	—

Updated to match(es) played on 23 March 2019. Source: Romanian Basketball Federation
Legend: Blue = home team win; Red = away team win.

== Play-offs ==
All series were played in a best-of-five games format, excluding the third place match.

=== Bracket ===
Quarter-finals
ICIM Arad	65	56	64
Târgoviște	61	37	51
Satu Mare	72	72	74
Universitatea Cluj	58	54	53
Sepsi SIC	130	106	116
Oradea	36	29	28
Olimpia Brașov	69	73	65	76
Phoenix Constanța	72	59	56	64

Semi-finals
Satu Mare	77	75	86
Olimpia Brașov	59	58	68
Sepsi SIC	91	85	83
ICIM Arad	64	68	46

Final
Sepsi SIC	66	57	47	56	59
Satu Mare	54	49	52	59	56
Third place
Olimpia Brașov	75	69
ICIM Arad	83	84

=== 5th to 8th ===
All series were played in a best-of-three games format.

Semi-finals
Phoenix Constanța	51	50
Universitatea Cluj	63	70
Târgoviște	84	74
Oradea	27	30

Final
Târgoviște	68	81
Universitatea Cluj	50	68
Third place
Phoenix Constanța	60	71
Oradea	50	46

== 9th to 13th ==
Pos	Team	Pld	W	L	PF	PA	PD	Pts
9	Târgu Mureș	4	3	1	284	222	+62	7
10	Rapid București	4	3	1	286	246	+40	7
11	Agronomia București	4	2	2	243	236	+7	6
12	KSE Târgu Secuiesc	4	1	3	225	288	−63	5
13	Alexandria	4	1	3	243	289	−46	5

Updated to match(es) played on 25 April 2019. Source: Romanian Basketball Federation

== Final rankings ==
	Team	Qualification or relegation
1	Sepsi SIC	
2	Satu Mare	
3	ICIM Arad	
4	Olimpia Brașov	
5	Târgoviște	
6	Universitatea Cluj-Napoca	
7	Phoenix Constanța	
8	Oradea	
9	Târgu Mureș	
10	Rapid București	
11	Agronomia București	
12	KSE Târgu Secuiesc	
13	Alexandria	
