= 2017–18 Liga Națională (women's basketball) =

Romanian women's basketball tournament

Liga Națională
- Games played: 114
- Teams: 10

Regular season
- Relegated: Phoenix Galați

Finals
- Champions: Sepsi SIC (3rd title)
- Runners-up: CSM Satu Mare
- Third place: Olimpia Brașov
- Fourth place: Universitatea Cluj

The 2017–18 Liga Națională season is the 68th season of the Liga Națională, the highest professional basketball league in Romania. Sepsi SIC Sfântu Gheorghe is the defending champion.

== Competition format ==
The Romanian Basketball Federation agreed a change in the competition format for the 2017–18 season:

- 10 teams played the regular season, consisting in a double-legged round robin format.
- At the end of the regular season, teams are split into two groups, one of them composed by the first six teams and the other one by the rest. In this second stage all points of the regular season are counted and the teams will face each other from its group twice.
- All teams from the group from 1st to 6th and the two first qualified teams from the bottom group will join the playoffs. In this knockout stage, quarterfinals and semifinals will be played with a best-of-three-games format and the final with a best-of-five one.

== Teams ==
CSM Târgoviște and Politehnica Iași withdrew from the competition and enrolled in the Liga I.

SCM Timișoara and CSU Alba Iulia were promoted from the previous season of the Liga I.

Location of teams in 2017–18 Liga Națională

Team	City	Arena	Capacity
BC Sirius	Târgu Mureș	Sala Sporturilor	2,000
CSBT	Alexandria	Dimitrie Ghica	900
CSM	Satu Mare	Ecaterina Both Arena	400
CSU	Alba Iulia	Sala Sporturilor	400
ICIM	Arad	Victoria Sports Hall	1,500
Olimpia CSU	Brașov	D.P. Colibași	1,700
Phoenix	Galați	Dunărea	1,500
SCM	Timișoara	Constantin Jude	2,200
Sepsi SIC	Sfântu Gheorghe	Arena Sepsi	3,000
Universitatea	Cluj Napoca	Polyvalent Hall / Horia Demian	7,308 / 2,525

== Regular season ==
Pos	Team	Pld	W	L	PF	PA	PD	Pts	Qualification
1	Sepsi SIC	20	19	1	1685	1229	+456	39	Qualification to Play-offs
2	CSM Satu Mare	20	13	7	1518	1470	+48	33	Qualification to Play-offs
3	Olimpia Brașov	20	11	9	1400	1423	−23	31	Qualification to Play-offs
4	Universitatea Cluj	20	9	11	1458	1458	0	29	Qualification to Play-offs
5	CSBT Alexandria	20	9	11	1458	1476	−18	29	Qualification to Play-offs
6	ICIM Arad	19	11	8	1347	1335	+12	30	Qualification to Play-offs
7	SCM Timișoara	19	8	11	1362	1336	+26	27	Qualification to Play-offs
8	CSU Alba Iulia (Note: CSU Alba Iulia was deducted 1 point.)	19	7	12	1207	1321	−114	25	Qualification to Play-offs
9	BC Sirius	19	1	18	1171	1558	−387	20	
10	Phoenix Galați (Note: Phoenix Galați withdrew from the championship.)	0	0	0	0	0	0	0	Withdrew

Updated to match(es) played on 18 March 2018. Source: Romanian Basketball Federation

== Play-offs ==
The higher seeded teams played games 1, 2 and 5 at home.

Quarter-finals
2 CSM Satu Mare	71	68	63
7 SCM Timișoara	82	50	53
3 Olimpia Brașov	73	74
6 ICIM Arad	66	66
1 Sepsi SIC	96	93
8 CSU Alba Iulia	44	57
4 Universitatea Cluj	72	78
5 CSBT Alexandria	71	75

Semi-finals
2 CSM Satu Mare	101	72
3 Olimpia Brașov	60	68
1 Sepsi SIC	97	87
4 Universitatea Cluj	69	59

Final
1 Sepsi SIC	76	71	60	85
2 CSM Satu Mare	46	51	68	76

Third place
3 Olimpia Brașov	86	76
4 Universitatea Cluj	70	72
