= 2016–17 Liga Națională (women's basketball) =

Romanian women's basketball tournament

Liga Națională
- Teams: 10

Finals
- Champions: Sepsi SIC (2nd title)
- Runners-up: Universitatea Cluj
- Third place: Olimpia Brașov
- Fourth place: CSM Târgoviște

The 2016–17 Liga Națională season is the 67th season of the Liga Națională, the highest professional basketball league in Romania. Sepsi SIC Sfântu Gheorghe is the defending champion.

== Competition format ==
The Romanian Basketball Federation agreed a change in the competition format for the 2016–17 season:

- 10 teams played the regular season, consisting in a double-legged round robin format.
- At the end of the regular season, teams are split into two groups, one of them composed by the first six teams and the other one by the rest. In this second stage all points of the regular season are counted and the teams will face each other from its group twice.
- All teams from the group from 1st to 6th and the two first qualified teams from the bottom group will join the playoffs. In this knockout stage, quarterfinals and semifinals will be played with a best-of-three-games format and the final with a best-of-five one.

== Teams ==
BC Sirius and Politehnica Iași were promoted from the previous season of the Liga I.

Location of teams in 2016–17 Liga Națională

Team	City	Arena	Capacity
BC Sirius	Târgu Mureș	Sala Sporturilor	2,000
CSBT	Alexandria	Dimitrie Ghica	900
CSM	Satu Mare	Ecaterina Both Arena	400
CSM	Târgoviște	Polyvalent Hall	2,000
ICIM	Arad	Victoria Sports Hall	1,500
Olimpia CSU	Brașov	D.P. Colibași	1,700
Phoenix	Galați	Dunărea	1,500
Politehnica	Iași	Polyvalent Hall	1,500
Sepsi SIC	Sfântu Gheorghe	Szabó Kati	1,000
Universitatea	Cluj Napoca	Polyvalent Hall / Horia Demian	7,308 / 2,525

== Regular season ==
Pos	Team	Pld	W	L	PF	PA	PD	Pts	Qualification
1	Sepsi SIC	28	26	2	2154	1638	+516	54	Qualification to playoffs
2	Universitatea Cluj	28	20	8	2086	1887	+199	48	Qualification to playoffs
3	CSM Târgoviște	28	18	10	1793	1710	+83	46	Qualification to playoffs
4	Olimpia Brașov	28	15	13	1978	1967	+11	43	Qualification to playoffs
5	Phoenix Galați	28	13	15	1993	2089	−96	41	Qualification to playoffs
6	CSM Satu Mare	28	10	18	1900	2019	−119	38	Qualification to playoffs
7	ICIM Arad	24	13	11	1728	1608	+120	37	Qualification to playoffs
8	CSBT Alexandria	24	11	13	1784	1788	−4	35	Qualification to playoffs
9	BC Sirius	24	4	20	1632	1958	−326	28	
10	Politehnica Iași	24	2	22	1517	1901	−384	26	

Updated to match(es) played on 22 March 2017. Source: Romanian Basketball Federation

== Play-offs ==
The higher seeded teams played games 1, 2 and 5 at home.

Quarter-finals
2 Universitatea Cluj	68	73
7 ICIM Arad	56	59
3 CSM Târgoviște	51	57	57
6 CSM Satu Mare	64	53	43
4 Olimpia Brașov	74	96
5 Phoenix Galați	72	75
1 Sepsi SIC	81	85
8 CSBT Alexandria	64	75

Semi-finals
2 Universitatea Cluj	69	90
3 CSM Târgoviște	65	62
1 Sepsi SIC	89	80
4 Olimpia Brașov	44	77

Final
1 Sepsi SIC	64	72	72	85
2 Universitatea Cluj	66	66	68	76

Third place
3 CSM Târgoviște	55	59
4 Olimpia Brașov	59	82
