= 2024–25 Liga Națională (women's basketball) =

Women's basketball league in Romania

Liga Națională
- Season: 2024–25
- Dates: Regular season: 11 October 2024 – 22 February 2025; Play Offs: 21 March – 30 April 2025
- Teams: 8

Regular season
- Season MVP: (United States) Ciera Johnson

Finals
- Champions: ACS Sepsi SIC (8th title)
- Runners-up: CSM Târgoviște
- Finals MVP: (United States) Ciera Johnson

Statistical leaders
| Points | (Philippines) Jack Animam | 19.7 |
| Rebounds | (Philippines) Jack Animam | 13.3 |
| Assists | (Bosnia and Herzegovina) Miljana Dzombeta | 4.8 |
| Steals | (Romania) Anca Sipos | 2.7 |
| Blocks | (Romania) Christina Badi | 1.3 |

The 2024–25 Liga Națională is the 75th season of the top division women's basketball league in Romania since its establishment in 1950. It starts in October 2024 with the first round of the regular season and ends in April 2025.

FCC UAV Arad are the defending champions.

ACS Sepsi SIC won their eighth title after beating CSM Târgoviște in the final.

== Format ==
Each team plays each other twice. Every team qualifies for the play offs where the semifinals are played as a best of three series and final is played as a best of five series.

== Regular season ==
| Pos | Team | Pld | W | L | PF | PA | PD | Pts | Qualification |
|---|---|---|---|---|---|---|---|---|---|
| 1 | CSM Târgoviște | 14 | 11 | 3 | 1139 | 764 | +375 | 25 (Note: CSM Târgoviște 130–126 ACS Sepsi SIC) | Play Offs |
| 2 | ACS Sepsi SIC | 14 | 11 | 3 | 1256 | 768 | +488 | 25 | Play Offs |
| 3 | FCC UAV Arad | 14 | 10 | 4 | 1106 | 821 | +285 | 24 | Play Offs |
| 4 | CS Rapid București | 14 | 8 | 6 | 1121 | 976 | +145 | 22 (Note: Rapid București 168–154 CSM Constanța) | Play Offs |
| 5 | CSM Constanța | 14 | 8 | 6 | 1008 | 969 | +39 | 22 | Play Offs |
| 6 | CS Universitatea Cluj | 14 | 5 | 9 | 884 | 1079 | −195 | 19 | Play Offs |
| 7 | CS Agronomia București | 14 | 3 | 11 | 734 | 1092 | −358 | 17 | Play Offs |
| 8 | CSU Brașov | 14 | 0 | 14 | 613 | 1392 | −779 | 14 | Play Offs |

Source: Liga Națională
Rules for classification: 1) Points; 2) Points difference; 3) Points scored.

== Play offs ==
Quarterfinals
1 | CSM Târgoviște | 118 | 101 | 2
8 | CSU Brașov | 26 | 23 | 0
4 | CS Rapid București | 87 | 87 | 2
5 | CSM Constanța | 78 | 76 | 0
2 | ACS Sepsi SIC | 105 | 81 | 2
7 | CS Agronomia București | 36 | 49 | 0
3 | FCC UAV Arad | 90 | 78 | 2
6 | CS Universitatea Cluj | 50 | 43 | 0

Semifinals
1 | CSM Târgoviște | 63 | 65 | 2
4 | CS Rapid București | 56 | 64 | 0
2 | ACS Sepsi SIC | 74 | 71 | 59 | 2
3 | FCC UAV Arad | 66 | 84 | 52 | 1

Final
1 | CSM Târgoviște | 72 | 51 | 43 | 53 | 64 | 2
2 | ACS Sepsi SIC | 58 | 65 | 66 | 51 | 69 | 3
Third place
3 | FCC UAV Arad | 91 | 71 | 80 | 2
4 | CS Rapid București | 77 | 72 | 54 | 1

=== 5–8 classification bracket ===
Semifinals
5 | CSM Constanța | 99 | 98 | 2
8 | CSU Brașov | 40 | 46 | 0
6 | CS Universitatea Cluj | 85 | 79 | 2
7 | CS Agronomia București | 65 | 62 | 0

Fifth place
5 | CSM Constanța | 98 | 96 | 2
6 | CS Universitatea Cluj | 72 | 60 | 0
Seventh place
7 | CS Agronomia București | 114 | 93 | 2
8 | CSU Brașov | 47 | 31 | 0

Champions of Romania

ACS Sepsi SIC
Eighth title
