= Jence Ann Rhoads =

American handball and basketball player

Personal information
- Nationality: United States
- Born: December 31, 1988 (age 37) Slippery Rock, Pennsylvania
- Height: 1.80 m (5 ft 11 in)

Sport
- Sport: Handball
- Position: Center Back
- Current club: (Spain) CB Atlético Guardés

Senior clubs
- Years: Team
- 2014–2019: (United States) Team Rogue
- 2019–: (Spain) CB Atlético Guardés
National team
- Years: Team
- 2014–present: USA
Medal record
Representing United States
Women's Handball
Nor.Ca. Handball Championship
Bronze medal – third place	2015 Salinas	Team competition
- Basketball career

Career information
- High school: Slippery Rock
- College: Vanderbilt (2007–2011)
- WNBA draft: 2011: undrafted
- Playing career: 2011–2014
- Position: Point guard
- Number: 10, 22

Career history
- 2011–2012: (Iceland) Haukar
- 2012–2013: (Romania) Sepsi SIC
- 2013–2014: (Romania) ICIM Arad

Career highlights
- First-team All-SEC (2010, 2011); SEC All-Freshman Team (2008); Cupa României (2014); Icelandic Company Cup (2011); Romanian All-Star (2014); Úrvalsdeild assists leader (2012)

Jence Ann Rhoads (born 31 December 1988) is an American professional handball player, a member of the United States women's national handball team and former professional basketball player.

== Personal life ==
Rhoads mother, Melinda Rhoads, played for the United States national handball team for 10 years and was a member of the 1984 U.S. Women's Olympic Handball Team. Her father, Robert Rhoads, is a former professional basketball player who played college basketball at Wake Forest University.

== Basketball ==
=== College ===
Rhoads played for Vanderbilt from 2007 to 2011. In 2011, she garnered first-team All-SEC honors and second-team all-conference honors by the Associated Press. She was the only player in the school's history to have at least 1100 points, 500 assists and 400 rebounds.

=== Vanderbilt statistics ===
Ratios
Year	Team	GP	FG%	3P%	FT%	RBG	APG	BPG	SPG	PPG
2007–08	Vanderbilt	34	38.8%	23.1%	62.2%	2.82	3.35	0.03	0.85	3.82
2008–09	Vanderbilt	35	49.7%	25.0%	83.9%	2.31	3.77	0.34	1.20	6.31
2009–10	Vanderbilt	32	47.1%	47.4%	72.7%	3.34	5.03	0.31	1.44	13.78
2010–11	Vanderbilt	29	45.0%	20.0%	61.2%	4.93	4.83	0.45	1.03	11.72
Career		130	45.8%	32.6%	69.7%	3.28	4.21	0.28	1.13	8.71

Totals
Year	Team	GP	FG	FGA	3P	3PA	FT	FTA	REB	A	BK	ST	PTS
2007–08	Vanderbilt	34	52	134	3	13	23	37	96	114	1	29	130
2008–09	Vanderbilt	35	84	169	1	4	52	62	81	132	12	42	221
2009–10	Vanderbilt	32	188	399	9	19	56	77	107	161	10	46	441
2010–11	Vanderbilt	29	139	309	2	10	60	98	143	140	13	30	340
Career		130	463	1011	15	46	191	274	427	547	36	147	1132

=== Club career ===
Rhoads signed with Úrvalsdeild kvenna club Haukar in August 2011. On October 2, 2011, she helped Haukar win the Icelandic Company Cup by defeating Keflavík, 63–61, in the cup finals. In the game, Rhoads had 34 points and 10 rebounds. In the final 16 of the Icelandic Basketball Cup, she scored 6 unanswered points during the last 20 seconds of Haukar's game against KR, sending the game to overtime. She ended having 23 points in Haukar's 78–73 victory. During the Úrvalsdeild playoffs, she helped Haukar sweep defending champions Keflavík in the semi-finals, 3–0, scoring 31 points in the third and deciding game. In the finals, Haukar lost to Njarðvík 3–1. For the season, she led the league with 7.5 assists per game.

Rhoads spent the 2012–2013 season with Sepsi SIC of the Romanian Liga Națională, averaging 11.7 points and 5.8 assists. In August, 2013, Rhoads signed with rivals BC ICIM Arad. She helped ICIM Arad win the Cupa României and finish second in the league. After the season she retired from professional basketball to fully focus on her handball career.

=== Awards, titles and accomplishments ===
==== Individual awards ====
- First-team All-SEC: 2010, 2011

==== Titles ====
- Cupa României: 2014
- Icelandic Company Cup: 2012

==== Accomplishments ====
- Romanian All-Star: 2014
- Úrvalsdeild kvenna assists leader: 2012

== Handball ==
As she went back from Romania in 2014 and she was searching for another basketball club her mother a 1984 Olympian was at the 30th Olympic reunion. There USA Team Handball told her mother about the USA Team Handball Residency Program at the Auburn University. A few months later Rhoads attended the tryouts for the program and was named to the United States women's national handball team in 2014.

In 2015, she helped the team win bronze at the Nor.Ca. Handball Championship.

She has won with Team Rogue which is basically the national team the National Championships twice 2017 and 2018. In 2018 she was the top scorer of the Nationals.

In March 2019 she received a contact to play until the end of the season for the Spanish handball club CB Atlético Guardés with an extension option.

== Academic ==
During her Basketball college career she did at Vanderbilt University a Bachelor in Multi / Interdisciplinary Studies. At the Residency Program at Auburn University she started with a master's degree in Kinesiology and Exercise Science which she finished in 2015. In 2016 she started on a PhD in Kinesiology.
