= Mladen Mihajlović =

Serbian basketball player (1985-)

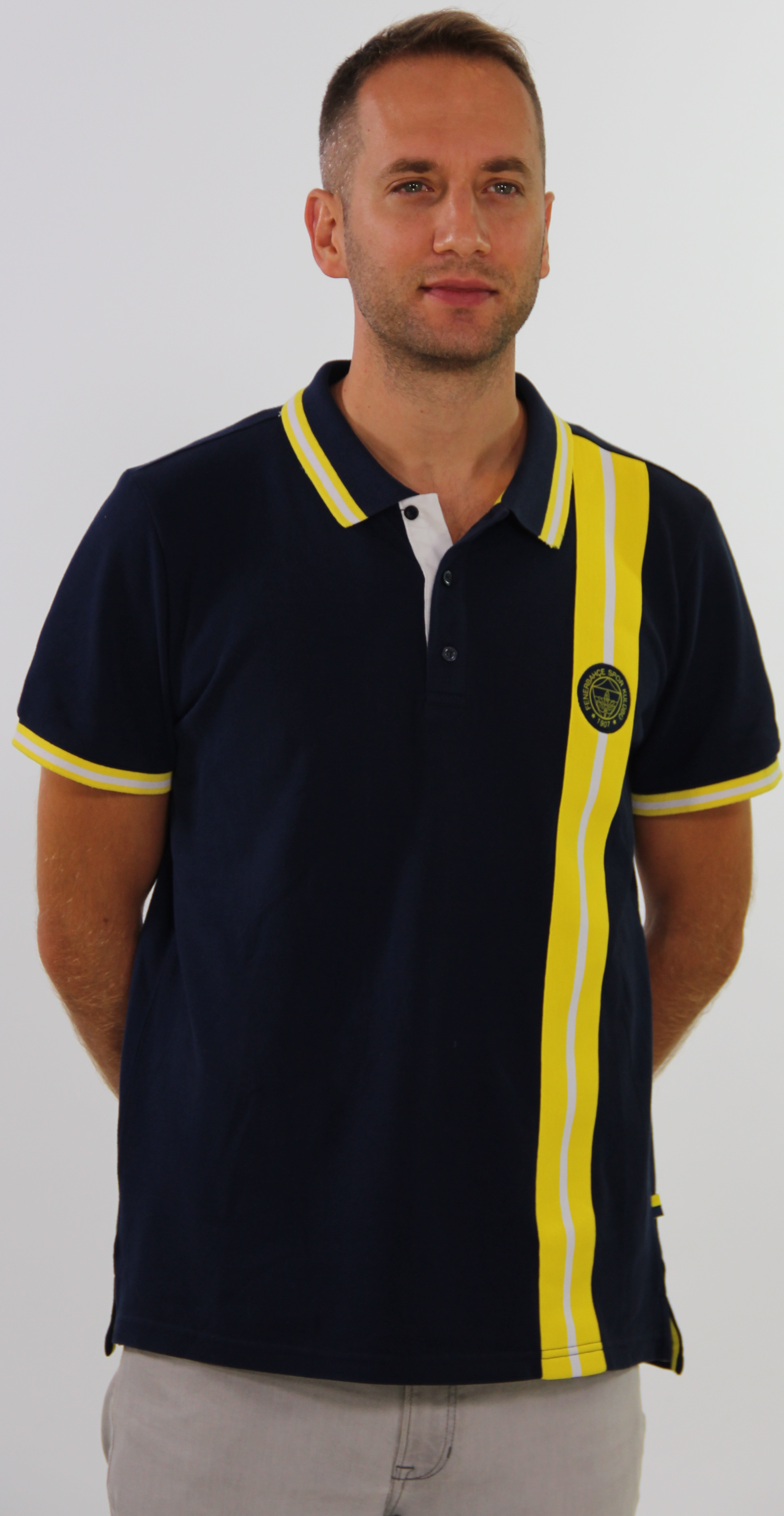

Free agent
- Positions: Strength and conditioning coach

Personal information
- Born: January 11, 1985 (age 41) Kruševac, SR Serbia, SFR Yugoslavia

Career information
- College: University of Belgrade; Universidad Católica San Antonio de Murcia
- Coaching career: 2006–present

Career history

Coaching
- 2006–2008: Torlak Aboca (conditioning)
- 2008–2010: Spartak Moscow Women (conditioning)
- 2010–2011: Crvena zvezda (conditioning)
- 2011–2012: Târgoviște Women (conditioning)
- 2012–2014: Radnički Kragujevac (conditioning)
- 2016: Partizan (conditioning)
- 2016–2018: Bayern Munich (conditioning)
- 2019–2021: Virtus Bologna (conditioning)
- 2021–2022: Fenerbahçe Beko (conditioning)
Medals
Men's basketball
Conditioning Coach for Serbia
Eurobasket
| Silver medal – second place | 2017 Turkey | Team |
Summer Olympics
| Silver medal – second place | 2016 Rio de Janeiro | Team |
2014 FIBA Basketball World Cup
| Silver medal – second place | 2014 Spain | Team |
FIBA Europe Under-20 Championship
| Bronze medal – third place | 2014 Greece | U20 Team |
FIBA Under-19 World Championship
| Silver medal – second place | 2013 Czech Republic | U19 Team |
FIBA Europe Under-18 Championship
| Bronze medal – third place | 2012 Lithuania/Latvia | U18 Team |

Mladen Mihajlović (Serbian Cyrillic: Младен Михајловић; born January 11, 1985) is a Serbian strength and conditioning coach and former basketball player.

== Early life ==
Mihajlović started his basketball career playing with the youth teams of Torlak and OKK Beograd. Later he moved to the junior team of Partizan. He earned his bachelor's degree in sport sciences from the University of Belgrade in 2011.

== Coaching career ==
Mihajlović was a strength and conditioning coach for the Spartak Moscow women's youth team (Russia) and the Târgoviște women's team (Romania), as well as for the domestic teams Crvena zvezda and Radnički Kragujevac.

In January 2016, he joined the Partizan coaching staff while Aleksandar Džikić was a head coach. After Serbian coach Aleksandar Đorđević had become the head coach for the Bayern Munich, Mihajlović joined their coaching staff as a strength and conditioning coach.

On March 11, 2019, Mihajlović joined a coaching staff of Virtus Bologna when Đorđević signed as their head coach.

On August 23, 2021, he has signed with Fenerbahçe Beko of the Basketball Super League.

=== National teams coaching ===
From 2012 to 2014, Mihajlović was a member of the coaching staff for the youth national selections of Serbia led by head coach Dejan Mijatović. In 2012, he worked with under-18 team, in 2013 with under-19 team and during 2014 he worked with Serbia under-20 team.

In summer 2014, Mihajlović became a strength and conditioning coach for Serbia men's senior national team. He was a member of coaching staff at the 2014 FIBA Basketball World Cup, FIBA EuroBasket 2015, 2016 Summer Olympics, FIBA EuroBasket 2017 and the 2019 FIBA Basketball World Cup.

== Career achievements ==
- Basketball Super League (Turkey) champion: 1 (with Fenerbahçe Beko: 2021–22)
- FIBA Champions League champion: 1 (with Segafredo Virtus Bologna: 2018–19)
- Italian League champion: 1 (with Segafredo Virtus Bologna: 2020–21)
- Romanian Women's League champion: 1 (with CSM Târgoviște: 2011–12)
- German Cup winner: 1 (with FC Bayern Munich: 2017–18)
- Romanian Women's Cup winner: 1 (with CSM Târgoviște: 2011–12)
