= Amy Denson =

American professional basketball player

Personal information
- Born: May 3, 1984 (age 42) Klamath Falls, Oregon, U.S.
- Listed height: 6 ft 1 in (1.85 m)

Career information
- High school: Crater (Central Point, Oregon)
- College: Arizona State (2002–2006)
- WNBA draft: 2006: undrafted
- Playing career: 2006–2013
- Position: Forward

Career history
- 2006–2007: Montañeras de Morovis
- 2007–2008: Energa Toruń
- 2008–2009: Alexandria
- 2009: Montañeras de Morovis
- 2010–2012: Sydney Uni Flames
- 2011–2012: Knox Raiders
- 2012–2013: Zamora
- 2013: Montañeras de Morovis

Career highlights
- WNBL All-Star Five (2011); Pac-10 All-Freshman Team (2003)

Amy Denson (born May 3, 1984) is an American former professional basketball player. She played for the Sun Devils in NCAA Division I, making her professional debut in Puerto Rico's Montañeras de Morovis. She played throughout Europe and Australia, finally signing with the Sydney Uni Flames in 2010 to play in the Women's National Basketball League. For the 2010–11 year, she was in the WNBL All-Star Five.

== Career ==
=== College ===
In college, Denson attended Arizona State University in Tempe, Arizona, playing for the Sun Devils in NCAA Division I.

=== Arizona State statistics ===
Legend
GP	Games played	GS	Games started	MPG	Minutes per game
FG%	Field goal percentage	3P%	3-point field goal percentage	FT%	Free throw percentage
RPG	Rebounds per game	APG	Assists per game	SPG	Steals per game
BPG	Blocks per game	PPG	Points per game	**Bold**	Career high

Year	Team	GP	Points	FG%	3P%	FT%	RPG	APG	SPG	BPG	PPG
2002–03	Arizona State	30	**297**	39.0%	0.0%	69.8%	**6.0**	0.8	0.9	0.1	**9.9**
2003–04	Arizona State	29	166	36.7%	45.5%	72.2%	4.7	1.5	0.9	**0.2**	5.7
2004–05	Arizona State	**34**	224	41.3%	**46.7%**	**78.8%**	4.0	**2.1**	**1.2**	0.1	6.6
2005–06	Arizona State	32	248	**48.1%**	37.5%	70.5%	4.3	1.9	0.8	0.1	7.8
Career		125	935	41.3%	37.5%	72.4%	4.7	1.6	1.0	0.2	7.5

=== Puerto Rico ===
Denson made her debut straight out of college, with Montañeras de Morovis in Puerto Rico's women's basketball league. Despite playing across the globe in Europe and Australia, Denson would return to Montañeras.

=== Europe ===
After a two-year stint in Puerto Rico, Denson played for Energa Toruń in Basket Liga Kobiet. After Poland, she then played for Alexandria in Romania's Liga Națională. After a few years in Australia, Denson returned to Europe, playing for Tintos de Toro Caja Rural Zamora in the 2012–13 Liga Femenina de Baloncesto.

=== Australia ===
In 2010, Denson signed with the Sydney Uni Flames to play in the Women's National Basketball League, Australia's premier women's league and the strongest league in the southern hemisphere. This would also be the highest level of basketball she would reach in her career. After averaging 18.7 points per game, Denson was awarded a place in the WNBL All-Star Five for 2010–11.
