= Bethy Mununga =

Belgian basketball player

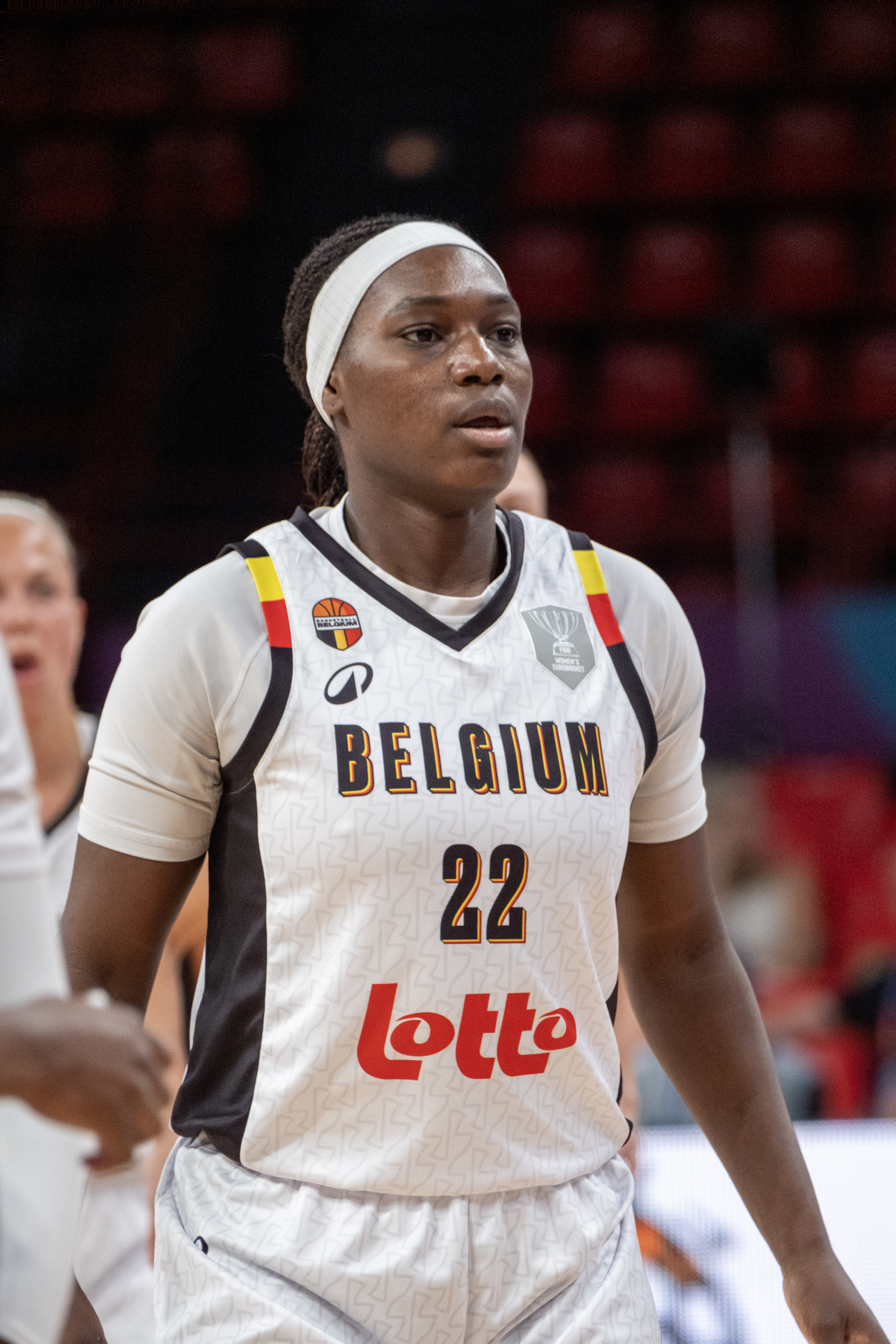
- Mununga with Belgium during 2025 EuroBasket

Personal information
- Born: 22 July 1997 (age 29)
- Listed height: 1.83 m (6 ft 0 in)

Career history
- 2017–2019: Northeastern Oklahoma A&M
- 2020–2021: South Florida Bulls
- 2022–2023: ACS Sepsi SIC
- 2022–2023: Villeneuve d'Ascq LM
- 2024–2024: Araski AES

Career highlights
- FIBA EuroBasket champion (2023, 2025); Liga Națională (2023); Cupa României (2023)

Bethy Mununga (born 22 July 1997) is a Belgian basketball player. She represented Belgium at the 2024 Summer Olympics. Mununga was also part of the Belgian squad that won the EuroBasket Women 2023 and EuroBasket Women 2025 championship.

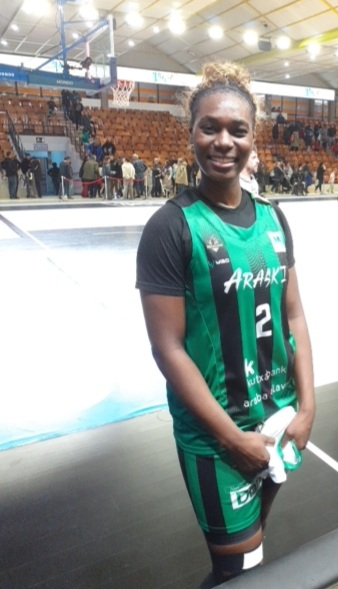
Mununga with Araski in 2025

== Honours ==
=== Club ===
==== ACS Sepsi SIC ====
- Romenian League: 2022–23
- Romenian Cup: 2022–23

=== National team ===
- EuroBasket Women: (gold) 2023, 2025
- Belgian Sports team of the Year: 2023, 2025
