= Dragan Petričević =

Bosnian-Romanian professional basketball coach

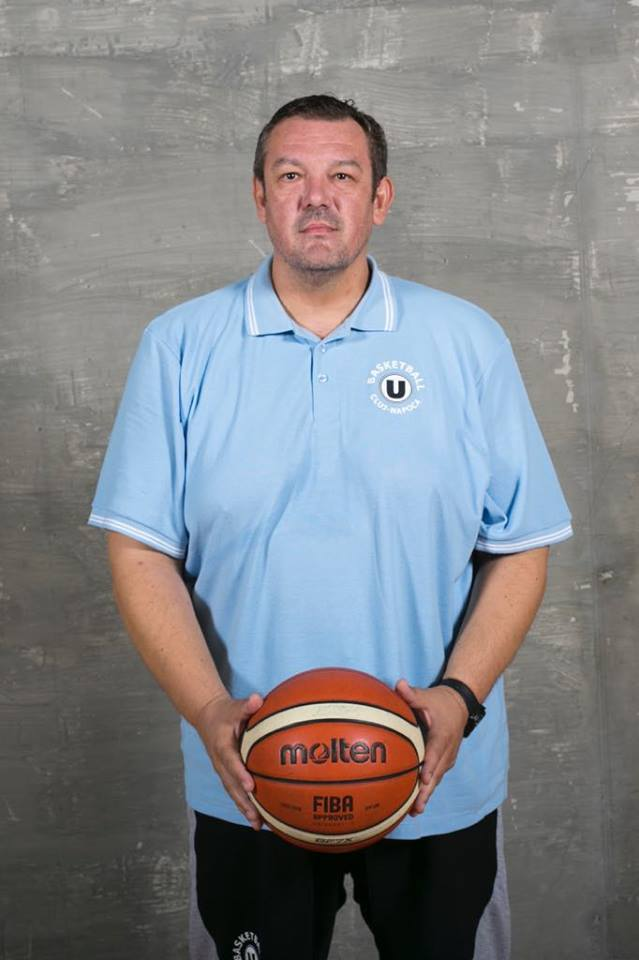

BC Timișoara
- Position: Head coach
- League: Liga Națională

Personal information
- Born: January 31, 1969 (age 57) Sarajevo, SR Bosnia and Herzegovina, SFR Yugoslavia
- Coaching career: 1993–present

Career history

Coaching
- 1995–1997: "U" SM Invest Cluj-Napoca
- 1997–1999: Politehnica Moldrom Iași
- 1999–2002: West Petrom Arad
- 2002–2003: CSM Târgoviște Women
- 2003–2004: Asesoft Ploiești
- 2004–2005: Farul Constanța
- 2006–2011: SCM Timișoara
- 2011–2012: Étoile Sportive du Sahel
- 2012–2013: Club Africain
- 2013–2014: MIA Academy
- 2014–2015: SCM Timișoara
- 2015–2018: U Cluj-Napoca Women
- 2018–2019: Sporting Club Alexandria
- 2019–present: SCM Timișoara
- 2021–2023: Romania

Dragan Petričević (Serbian Cyrillic: Драган Петричевић; born 31 January 1969) is a Bosnian-Romanian professional basketball coach. He currently serves as a head coach for SCM Timișoara of the Liga Națională.

== Coaching career ==
Petričević was a head coach for "U" SM Invest Cluj-Napoca, Politehnica Moldrom Iași, West Petrom Arad, Asesoft Ploiești, Farul Constanța, SCM Timișoara of the Romanian Men's League. Petričević coached Étoile Sportive du Sahel and Club Africain of Tunisian Division I Basketball League and MIA Academy of the Georgian Superliga.

=== Women's basketball ===
Also, coached CSM Târgoviște and CS Universitatea Cluj-Napoca of the Romanian Women's League.

== International career ==
Petričević had two stints with Romania men's national team, from 1996 to 1998 and in 2000. He also coached Romania national under-19 basketball team in 2007. In 2017, he was named a head coach for the Romania women's national basketball team.

== Career achievements and awards ==
- FIBA Africa Clubs Champions Cup winner: 1 (with Étoile Sportive du Sahel: 2011)
- Romanian Men's League champion: 4 (with "U" SM Invest Cluj-Napoca: 1995–96; with West Petrom Arad: 2000–01, 2001–02; with Asesoft Ploiești: 2003–04)
- Tunisian League champion: 1 (with Étoile Sportive du Sahel: 2011–12)
- Tunisian Cup winner: 1 (with Étoile Sportive du Sahel: 2011–12)
- Romanian Women's League champion: 1 (with CSM Târgoviște: 2002–03)
- Romanian Men's Cup winner: 3 (with Asesoft Ploiești: 2003–04; with SCM Timișoara/Elba Timișoara: 2009–10, 2014–15)

Individual

- Romanian Coach of the Year: 2008
- The Best coach of the FIBA Africa Clubs Champions Cup: 2011
