= Gabi Bade =

Filipina basketball player (born 1996)

No. 24 – Pasig Queenpin
- Position: Guard
- League: WMPBL

Personal information
- Born: December 22, 1996 (age 29) Milpitas, California, U.S.
- Listed height: 5 ft 8 in (1.73 m)

Career information
- High school: Pinewood (Los Altos)
- College: Buffalo (2016–2017); Sacramento (2018–2020)
- Playing career: 2021–present

Career history
- 2021–2022: ENAD
- 2024–2025: KSE Târgu Secuiesc
- 2025: Solar Home–Pangasinan Suns
- 2026–present: Pasig Queenpin
Medals
Women's basketball
Philippines
SEA Games
Gold medal – first place	2021 Hanoi	Team
Women's 3x3 basketball
Philippines
Asian Beach Games
Silver medal – second place	2026 Sanya	Team

Elisha Gabriell Somera Bade (born December 22, 1996) is a Filipina basketball player for the Pasig Queenpin of the Women's Maharlika Pilipinas Basketball League (WMPBL).

== Early life and education ==
Gabi Bade was born on December 22, 1996, in Milpitas, California. Her father is former Philippine Basketball Association player Cris Bade while her mother Lannie was a cheerleader and a triathlete. Gabi Bade has an older sister. The younger Bade daughter took up basketball at age 6, with her father initially not anticipating her to become a competitive player due to struggling to walk at a young age.

She studied in Pinewood School for high school. For college, she attended University at Buffalo and moved to the California State University, Sacramento to be closer to her ill grandmother.

== Career ==
=== College ===
Bade played for the Buffalo Bulls for two seasons from 2015 to 2017. She later joined the Sacramento State Hornets. She red-shirted for the 2017–18 season before playing for two seasons from 2018 to 2020.

=== Club ===
After graduating from Sacramento State, Bade went to Cyprus to join ENAD WBC of the Cyprus Women's Basketball Division A. She played from 2021 to early 2022.

After two years of free agency, Bade was signed in by KSE Târgu Secuiesc of the Romanian Liga Națională in 2024.

Bade went to the Philippines to suit up for the Solar Home–Pangasinan Suns in the inaugural season of the Women's Maharlika Pilipinas Basketball League (WMPBL) in 2025. She was later moved to the Pasig Queenpin for the 2026 WMPBL season.

=== National team ===
Bade have suited up for the Philippines national team. However, as she has obtained her Philippine passport after age 16, she is classed as a restricted player under the FIBA eligibility rules active until 2025. It is unknown if Bade still considered as such when the age limit was raised to 18 in December 2025.

She first competed for the team at the 2019 William Jones Cup in Taiwan.

She helped the national team win a gold medal in the women's basketball tournament of the 2021 SEA Games in 2022.

Bade played in the 2023 William Jones Cup. She was originally to play for the Philippines in the 2025 SEA Games in Thailand, but was excluded following changes to the eligibility rules set by the organizers.

== Personal life ==
Gabi Bade has Leeana as her older sister. Leeana played basketball with Gabi in Sacramento State but later became a Muay Thai athlete after graduating.
