= Politehnica Iași =

Politehnica Iași may refer to:

- FC Politehnica Iași (1945), a dissolved football club in Iași, Romania
- FC Politehnica Iași (2010), a football club in Iași, Romania
- CS Politehnica Iași, a sports society in Iași, Romania
- CS Politehnica Iași (rugby), a rugby club in Iași, Romania
- CS Politehnica Iași (men's basketball), a men's basketball club in Iași, Romania
- CS Politehnica Național Iași, a women's basketball club in Iași, Romania
- Gheorghe Asachi Technical University of Iaşi, a technical university in Iași, Romania
