= Britney Jones =

American basketball player

Personal information
- Born: September 1, 1987 (age 39) Chicago, Illinois
- Listed height: 5 ft 10 in (1.78 m)

Career information
- High school: John Marshall Metropolitan (Chicago, Illinois)
- College: UAB (2005–2009)
- Playing career: 2009–present
- Position: Point guard
- Number: 16

Career history
- 2010: Montaneras de Morovis
- 2010: FEA Neas Halkidonas
- 2011–2013: Fjölnir
- 2013–2014: CSM Targoviste
- 2014–2015: Olimpia CSU Brașov
- 2015–2017: Chevakata Vologda
- 2017–2018: Royal Castors Braine
- 2018: BCF Elfic Fribourg Basket
- 2018–2019: Belfius Namur Capitale
- 2019: Santa Tecla BC
- 2019: Ślęza Wrocław
- 2020: Hapoel Petah Tikva
- 2020–2021: BC Tsmoki-Minsk
- 2021–2022: Elitzur Holon
- 2021–2022: Sepsi SIC
- 2023: Libertadoras
- 2023: Zagłębie Sosnowiec
- 2024: Ulaanbaatar Amazons
- 2024: A.D. Isidro Metapán
- 2024: AZS Poznań
- 2024: Zagłębie Sosnowiec
- 2024–2025: AZS Poznań
- 2025–2026: MOSiR Bochnia
- 2026: Abejas

Career highlights
- Belgian League champion (2018); 2× El Salvador League champion (2019, 2024); 2× Romanian League champion (2014, 2023); Cupa României (2023); Swiss League champion (2018); Romanian League All-Star (2013); Romanian League scoring leader (2015); Icelandic All-Star (2013); 2× Úrvalsdeild kvenna scoring leader (2012, 2013); Úrvalsdeild kvenna assists leader (2013); Conference USA All-Tournament 2nd Team (2009); Conference USA Sixth Player of the Year (2007); Conference USA All-Freshmen Team (2006)

Britney Cimone Jones (born September 1, 1987) is an American professional basketball player for MOSiR Bochnia of the Polish Basket Liga Kobiet. During her career, she has won the national championship in Romania, Belgium, Switzerland and El Salvador.

== Early life and high school ==
Jones grew up in Chicago, Chicago, Illinois and attended John Marshall Metropolitan High School. She was named the 2004–05 Athlete of the Year as well as Player of the Year by the Chicago Sun-Times while receiving all-state, all-area and all-city recognition from the Chicago Sun-Times. Marshall won the CPS City Championship in 2002 and 2004 while placing third in the state in 2002.

== College career ==
Jones played college basketball for the UAB Blazers of the University of Alabama at Birmingham from 2005 to 2009.

== Professional career ==
In 2011, Jones signed with Fjölnir of the Icelandic Úrvalsdeild kvenna. She was selected for the Icelandic All-Star game in January 2013 while also appearing in the three point competition where she finished second. During the season, she led the league with 29.3 points per game. She returned to Fjölnir the following season and again led the league in scoring, averaging 31.6 points per game. On 20 February 2013, she scored 52 points in an overtime loss against Njarðvík.

She spent the 2017–2018 season with Royal Castors Braine, helping the team to the Belgian championship. After the playoffs, she signed with BCF Elfic Fribourg Basket, replacing injured Noémie Mayombo, and helped the team win the Swiss championship. The following season, she returned to Belgium and signed with Belfius Namur Capitale. She left Naumur-Capitale at the end of February 2019.

She started the 2019–20 season with Ślęza Wrocław where she averaged 11.4 points and 3.1 assists in 8 games. In January 2020, she signed with Hapoel Petah Tikva of the Ligat ha'Al.

During the 2022–2023 season, she played for Sepsi SIC where she won both the Romanian national championships and the Cupa României.

In 2023, she played for Libertadoras in the in Mexican LNBPF but left the team in May. In September, she signed with KACM Kawkab de Marrakech in the Moroccan league. In October 2023, she signed with Zaglebie Sosnowiec of the Basket Liga Kobiet.

On September 22, 2024, she won the El Salvador championship with A.D. Isidro Metapán.

== Statistics ==
=== College statistics ===
Legend
GP	Games played	GS	Games started	MPG	Minutes per game
FG%	Field goal percentage	3P%	3-point field goal percentage	FT%	Free throw percentage
RPG	Rebounds per game	APG	Assists per game	SPG	Steals per game
BPG	Blocks per game	PPG	Points per game	**Bold**	Career high

Year	Team	GP	Points	FG%	3P%	FT%	RPG	APG	SPG	BPG	PPG
2005–06	Alabama at Birmingham	27	326	**42.5%**	**39.9%**	65.2%	2.4	2.0	1.3	0.3	12.1
2006–07	Alabama at Birmingham	**32**	310	32.2%	26.5%	66.7%	2.8	2.6	1.8	**0.5**	9.7
2007–08	Alabama at Birmingham	30	383	37.2%	31.4%	69.6%	4.3	3.1	**2.7**	0.4	12.8
2008–09	Alabama at Birmingham	30	**582**	39.8%	30.7%	**77.9%**	**4.6**	**3.5**	2.2	0.4	**19.4**
Career		119	1601	37.9%	31.8%	71.6%	3.6	2.8	2.0	0.4	13.5
