= ACS Sepsi SIC =

- Nickname: Alb-Verzile (The White and Greens)
- Leagues: Liga Națională
- Founded: 2012; 13 years ago
- History: ACS Sepsi SIC (2012–present)
- Arena: Sepsi Aréna
- Capacity: 3,000
- Location: Sfântu Gheorghe, Romania
- Team colors: Green, White
- President: Zoltán Miklós
- Team manager: István Rusz
- Head coach: Zoran Mikes
- Championships: 8 Romanian Leagues; 9 Romanian Cups
- Website: Official website
Home	Away

ACS Sepsi SIC Sfântu Gheorghe or commonly Sepsi SIC is a women's basketball professional club based in Sfântu Gheorghe, Romania. The former club was Sepsi BC, but it was dissolved in 2012 and replaced by Sepsi SIC. The club competes in the Romanian First League and for the first time in the EuroCup Women in the 2013–14 season.

== History ==
At the beginning of the 2012–2013 season, the objective of the club was to bring the fans back to the arena, in order to forget the chaotic precedent season. The objective was to qualify for the championships' playoffs. This was realised, Sepsi SIC played in the playoffs but was eliminated by CSU Alba Iulia. The club also took part in the Final Four of the Romanian Cup in Alba Iulia. Finally, Sepsi SIC ended the season at the fifth place. No club decided to register to the 2013–14 EuroCup, therefore Sepsi SIC, whose financial situation was solid, was given a vacant Romanian place.

- In the 2007/2008 season the team finished in the 2nd place in the regular season, and lost the final (2-3) against BC ICIM Arad, but they won the Romanian Cup.
- In the 2008/2009 season the team finished in the 3rd position after the regular season and they lost in the final (0-3) against MCM Târgoviște.
- In the 2008/2009 season LMK Sepsi BC played in the FIBA EuroCup Women. In the EuroCup Women 2008–09, the team was drawn in Group B with Dynamo Kursk (Russia), Bnot Hasharon (Israel), and Challes-les-Eaux (France). They finished in the 3rd place with 3 wins and 3 losses. In the Sixteenth-Finals they met Taranto Cras Basket (Italy) and they lost both games.
- LMK Sepsi BC participated in EuroCup Women 2009–10 and was drawn in Group G with Dynamo Moscow, Hapoel Tel Aviv, and WBC Dunav Ruse. They finished in the 3rd place with 2 wins and 4 defeats. In the Sixteenth-Finals they met Mann Filter Zaragoza and they lost both games.
- In the 2009/2010 season the team finished in the 2nd position after the regular season, but they lost in the semifinals of the play-off against BC ICIM Univ. Vasile Goldiș Arad (1–2). They finished in the 3rd place beating CSM Satu Mare (2–0) and they won the bronze medals in the Romanian Championship and in the Romanian Cup too.
- In the 2010/2011 season the team finished in the 3rd position after the regular season, they lost in the semifinals of the play-off against BC ICIM Univ. Vasile Goldiș Arad (1–2). They finished in the 3rd place beating BCM Danzio Timișoara (2–0) and they won the bronze medals in the Romanian Championship and in the Romanian Cup too.
- In the 2015–2016 season the club won the Romanian Cup and for the first time won the Romanian Championship, beating in the Final CSU Alba Iulia (3–0).

== Honours ==
Liga Națională

Winners (7): 2015–16, 2016–17, 2017–18, 2018–19, 2020–21, 2021–22, 2022–23, 2024–25
Runners-up (1): 2014–15

Cupa României

Winners (9): 2007–08, 2014–15, 2015–16, 2017–18, 2018–19, 2020–21, 2021–22, 2022–23, 2024–25
Runners-up (2): 2013–14, 2016–17

== Current roster ==
Note: Flags indicate national team eligibility at FIBA-sanctioned events. Players may hold other non-FIBA nationalities not displayed.

ACS Sepsi SIC roster
Players
Coaches

Pos.	No.	Nat.	Name	Ht.
PG	5	(Serbia)	Mikes, Lana	1.61 m (5 ft 3 in)
F	6	(Romania)	Mititelu, Nicoleta	1.80 m (5 ft 11 in)
SG	7	(Romania)	Ghizila, Ioana	1.73 m (5 ft 8 in)
PG	8	(United States)	Jones, Britney	1.74 m (5 ft 9 in)
PG	10	(Romania)	Cătinean, Ștefania	1.65 m (5 ft 5 in)
F	12	(Denmark)	Jespersen, Maria	1.83 m (6 ft 0 in)
C	13	(United States)	Cave, Khadijiah	1.90 m (6 ft 3 in)
PF	15	(North Macedonia)	Kmetovska, Ivana	1.90 m (6 ft 3 in)
PG	21	(Romania)	Părău, Annemarie	1.74 m (5 ft 9 in)
F	22	(Belgium)	Mununga, Bethy	1.83 m (6 ft 0 in)
SG	24	(Romania)	Pop, Anamaria	1.70 m (5 ft 7 in)
F	41	(Romania)	Toma, Ioana	1.73 m (5 ft 8 in)
SG	45	(Bulgaria)	Hristova, Borislava	1.81 m (5 ft 11 in)

Head coach

- (Bosnia and Herzegovina) Zoran Mikes

Assistant coach(es)

- (Romania) Samuilă Zoltán

Legend

- (C) Team captain
- Injured

- Roster
Updated: 19 December 2022
