= CS Phoenix Galați =

CS Phoenix Galați may refer to:

- CS Phoenix Galați (men's basketball)
- CS Phoenix Galați (women's basketball)
