= 2018–19 Liga Națională =

2018–19 Liga Națională may refer to the following competitions in Romania:

- 2018–19 Liga Națională (men's basketball)
- 2018–19 Liga Națională (women's basketball)
- 2018–19 Liga Națională (men's handball)
- 2018–19 Liga Națională (women's handball)
