= Liga Națională =

Liga Națională (Romanian for "National League") can refer to the following:

- Liga Națională (men's basketball), the top-tier professional basketball league of Romania
- Liga Națională (women's basketball), the top-tier women's professional basketball league of Romania
- Liga Națională (men's handball), the top-tier men's team handball league in Romania
- Liga Națională (women's handball), the top-tier women's team handball league in Romania
- Liga Națională de hochei, the Romanian Hockey League
