= Annemarie Părău =

Romanian basketball player

Annemarie Gödri-Părău
No. 21 – CSM Constanta
- Position: Guard
- League: Divizia A

Personal information
- Born: March 8, 1984 (age 42) Timișoara, Romania
- Listed height: 5 ft 9 in (1.75 m)

Career information
- Playing career: 2006–present

Career history
- 2006–2007: Belfius Namur
- 2007–2008: Reims
- 2008–2009: Elitzur Ramla
- 2009–2010: CSM Târgovişte
- 2010-2011: CSS LMK BC Sepsi Sfântu Gheorghe
- 2011–2013: CSM Satu Mare
- 2013–2014: CSU Alba Iulia
- 2014–2023: ACS Sepsi SIC
- 2023-present: CSM Constanța

Annemarie Gödri-Părău (born March 8, 1984) is a Romanian professional female basketball player. She is Nigerian descent through her father. As a member of the senior Romanian national basketball team, Gödri-Părău competed at the 2005 EuroBasket, also at the 2007 EuroBasket. Gödri-Părău is a multiple Romanian Cup Winner, last with CSM Constanța (2024).
