= 2016–17 Liga Națională =

2016–17 Liga Națională may refer to the following competitions in Romania:

- 2016–17 Liga Națională (men's basketball)
- 2016–17 Liga Națională (women's basketball)
- 2016–17 Liga Națională (men's handball)
- 2016–17 Liga Națională (women's handball)
