= USA Team Handball Nationals – women's open division =

Team handball tournament to determine the national champion from the US

Tournament information
- Sport: Handball
- Month played: April–May
- Established: 1975
- Format: Round-robin, knockout stage
- Teams: 2 - 20

Current champion
- Chicago Inter Handball

The women's open national is a USA Team Handball tournament to determine the national handball champion from the US. Chicago Inter holds the most title in the women's division.

The 2020 and 2021 US club nationals were cancelled due to COVID-19 and, hence, no champion was designated.

== Results ==
Year	Final			Third-place match			Teams
Year	Champions	Score	Runners-up	3rd place	Score	4th place	Teams
1975; Ohio State University, Ohio	Kansas State University	Championship serie: 3-1-0 (8-8), (5-4), (10-8), (9-8)	Ohio State University	—	—	—	2
1976; Ohio State University, Ohio	East Coast HC		Kansas Merchants	Slippery Rock University of Pennsylvania		Ohio State University	4
1977; Milwaukee, Wisconsin							
1978; Hofstra University, New York	Ohio State University						4 West Point, New York THC, Miller Port HC & a country mixed team
1979							
1980; Colorado Springs, Colorado							
1981	New England						
1982; Colorado Springs, Colorado	G and D Leisure						
1983; Washington, D.C.							
1984	California West						
1985	Panters						
1986; Ohio State University, Ohio							
1987	P.A. Par						
1988	Supercade GT						
1989; Adelphi University & Nassau Community College, New York	Supercade GT		New York City THC	West Point			
1990; Reno, Nevada	University of Minnesota	20–18	Supercade GT				
1991; Oklahoma City, Oklahoma	Colorado Springs Stars	31–23	University of Minnesota	Supercade GT	19–18	LA Stars	
1992	Colorado Springs Stars						
1993; Philadelphia, Pennsylvania							
1994							
1995				San Francisco CalHeat (Smurfs) (Note: San Francisco CalHeat played at the beginning with the name Smurfs.)			
1996	Slippery Rock			San Francisco CalHeat (Smurfs)			
1997			San Francisco CalHeat (Smurfs)				
1998			San Francisco CalHeat (Smurfs)				
1999							
2000; Tampa, Florida	Antique Gold		Atlanta Storm	New York City THC		Slippery Rock University of Pennsylvania	9
2001; Atlanta, Georgia	Antique Gold		New York City THC	Slippery Rock University of Pennsylvania		Atlanta Storm	9
2002; Nassau Community College, NY	Antique Gold		New York City THC	Atlanta Storm		Furman University	10
2003; Reno, Nevada	San Francisco CalHeat (Smurfs)	13-11	Rock Handball	Virginia Commonwealth University	12-4	West Point Black	5
2004; Houston, Texas	DC Diplomats THC	28-23	San Francisco CalHeat (Smurfs)	West Point Black	28-12	Gold Stars	6
2005	DC Diplomats THC		San Francisco CalHeat (Utah Cal Smurfs)	Carolina		Shooting Stars	10
2006; Houston, Texas	San Francisco CalHeat (Smurfs)	20-18	Cortland State	West Point Black	8-6	Carolina Blue	9
2007; University of Delaware, DE	Chicago Inter Handball	25-22	Cortland State	Atlanta Condors Women	30-21	San Francisco CalHeat (Smurfs)	
2008; Newark, Delaware	Chicago Inter Handball						
2009; Elgin, Illinois	Chicago Inter Handball	38-25	Lady Condors	Houston Firehawks TH		New England Freeze	7
2010; Las Vegas, Nevada	Houston Firehawks THC	28-25	Chicago Inter Handball	Denver HC		New England Freeze	9
2011; Salt Lake City, Utah	Chicago Inter Handball	20-19	New York City THC	New York Athletic Club/Dynamo HC	27-20	Carolina	
2012; Minneapolis, Minnesota	Alberta	24-23	Chicago Inter Handball	New York City THC			
2013; Reno, Nevada	Chicago Inter Handball	21-20	Dynamo HC	Carolina Blue	24-19	Los Angeles THC	10
2014; Reno, Nevada	Dynamo HC	20-14	Chicago Inter Handball	Phoenix THC	26-25	Los Angeles THC	7
2015; York, Pennsylvania	Chicago Inter Handball	23-17	New York City THC	Carolina Blue	25-20	Ocean NJ THC	10
2016; York, Pennsylvania	Odenwald		Chicago Inter Handball	New York City THC		San Francisco CalHeat	10
2017; Myrtle Beach, South Carolina	Team Rogue	33-32	New York City THC	Handball Quebec	24-20	DC Diplomats	11
2018; Myrtle Beach, South Carolina	Team Rogue	29-23	New York City THC	Handball Quebec	30-14	Boston Team Handball Club	11
2019; Myrtle Beach, South Carolina	New York City THC	34-28	Chicago Inter Handball	DC Diplomats	16-15	Boston Team Handball Club	8
2020; Detroit, Michigan		cancelled			cancelled		
2021		cancelled			cancelled		
2022; Adrian, Michigan	Handball Quebec	24-15	Carolina Blue	Chicago Inter Handball	16-15	Boston Team Handball Club	12
2023; Spokane, Washington	San Francisco CalHeat	30-26	New York City THC	Handball Quebec II	25-18	Boston Team Handball Club	8
2024; Spokane, Washington	New York City THC	18–17	Quebec U25	Alberta U21	19–16	San Francisco CalHeat	5
2025; Bettendorf, Iowa	New York City THC	31–23	Apex-Irvine	Chicago Inter Handball	29–23	iHandball	8
2026; Bettendorf, Iowa	Chicago Inter Handball	34–18	Team Rogue	San Diego HC	27–21	New York City THC	14

=== Division B ===
Year	Final			Third-place match			Teams
Year	Champions	Score	Runners-up	3rd place	Score	4th place	Teams
1988	West Point Black						

== Individual awards ==
Year	Player	Team	Player	Team	Player	Team
	MVP		MVG		Top Scorer	
2000	Dawn Marple	Slippery Rock University of Pennsylvania	Laura Ryan	Antique Gold		
2001	Astrid Siene	New York City THC	Danielle Ryan	Antique Gold		
2002	Marketa Chromkova	New York City THC	Anca Hesser	Antique Gold		
2003	Grit Farrell	Rock Handball	Lasonia Morris	Virginia Commonwealth University		
2004	Katharina Ellmers	DC Diplomats	Kiera Connerty	West Point Black		
2006	Kathy Darling	Chicago Inter Handball	Jacque Messel	Chicago Inter Handball		
2007	Sladjana Prvanov	Chicago Inter Handball	Nataliya Mitrjuk	Chicago Inter Handball		
2008	cancelled		cancelled			
2009	Jolanta Kunickaite	Chicago Inter Handball	Katarina Husova	Chicago Inter Handball		
2011	Annika Schmid	New York City THC	Jacque Messel	Chicago Inter Handball		
2012	Amber Smart	Alberta	Kate Greabeiel	Alberta		
2013	Jolanta Kunickaite	Chicago Inter Handball	Sophie Fasold	Dynamo HC		
2014	Caroline Wahlberg	Dynamo HC	Sophie Fasold	Dynamo HC		
2015	Irina Irimia	Chicago Inter Handball	Jacque Messel	Chicago Inter Handball		
2017	Kathy Darling	Team Rogue	Anna Oedegaard Dennison	New York City THC	Cecile Balanche	DC Diplomats
2018	Cecile Balanche	DC Diplomats	Georgeta Marincas	Carolina Blue	Jence Ann Rhoads	Team Rogue
2019	Noelia Anton Bolanos	Boston THC	Athena Del Rosario	San Francisco CalHeat	Kathrine Agger	San Francisco CalHeat II
	Cindy Stinger MVP		Pam Boyd MVG		Top Scorer	
2022	Zion Krullars	Carolina Blue	Vassilia Gagnon	Handball Quebec	Mariia Rachiteleva	Los Angeles THC
2023	Micaela Millar	New York City THC	Natallia Zhelnova	San Francisco CalHeat	Oihane Manrique Garin	Chicago Inter Handball
2024	Michelle Laerke	New York City THC	Stephanie Moreno	New York City THC	Céline Labonté (38)	Quebec U25
2025					Kathleen Darling (34)	Apex-Irvine
2026	Leonida Gichevska	Chicago Inter HC	Sophia Broadhead	Chicago Inter HC	Beyza Turkoglu Sengul (54)	San Diego HC

== Medal count ==
Rank	Club	Gold	Silver	Bronze	Total
1	Chicago Inter HC	7	5	2	14
2	New York City THC	3	8	3	14
3	San Francisco CalHeat	3	4	2	9
4	Antique Gold	3	0	0	3
5	Supercade GT	2	1	1	4
6	Team Rogue	2	1	0	3
7	DC Diplomats THC	2	0	1	3
8	Colorado Springs Stars	2	0	0	2
9	Québec	1	1	3	5
10	Dynamo HC	1	1	1	3
11	Kansas State University	1	1	0	2
11	Ohio State University	1	1	0	2
11	University of Minnesota	1	1	0	2
14	Alberta	1	0	1	2
14	Houston Firehawks TH	1	0	1	2
16	California West	1	0	0	1
16	East Coast HC	1	0	0	1
16	G and D Leisure	1	0	0	1
16	New England	1	0	0	1
16	Odenwald	1	0	0	1
16	P.A. Par	1	0	0	1
16	Panters	1	0	0	1
23	Cortland State	0	2	0	2
24	Carolina THC	0	1	3	4
25	Atlanta Storm	0	1	1	2
25	Lady Condors / Atlanta Condors	0	1	1	2
27	Rock Handball	0	1	0	1
28	West Point	0	0	3	3
29	Slippery Rock University of Pennsylvania	0	0	2	2
30	Apex-Irvine	0	0	1	1
30	Denver HC	0	0	1	1
30	Phoenix THC	0	0	1	1
30	San Diego HC	0	0	1	1
30	Virginia Commonwealth University	0	0	1	1
Totals (34 entries)		38	30	30	98
