= Universitatea CSM Oradea =

- Leagues: Liga Națională
- Founded: 2004; 21 years ago
- History: CSU Mihai Eminescu (2004–2007); CSU Oradea (2007–2009); Universitatea CSM Oradea (2009–present)
- Arena: Arena Antonio Alexe
- Capacity: 2,500
- Location: Oradea, Romania
- Team colors: White, Blue
- President: Adriana Floruța
- Head coach: Ioana Anica
- Website: csu-oradea.ro
Home	Away

Universitatea CSM Oradea, commonly known as U CSM Oradea, is a Romanian women's basketball club based in Oradea, currently participates in the Liga Națională, the top-tier league in Romania.

The club played in the last years in the second-tier Liga I. However, in 2018 the league was merged with the top-tier Liga Națională.

U CSM Oradea is the women's basketball section of both CSM Oradea and CSU Oradea, after a partnership signed between CSM, the municipality of Oradea sports club and CSU, University of Oradea sports club.

== Current roster ==
Note: Flags indicate national team eligibility at FIBA-sanctioned events. Players may hold other non-FIBA nationalities not displayed.

Universitatea CSM Oradea roster
Players
Coaches

Pos.	No.	Nat.	Name
PG		(Romania)	Chiș, Ruxandra	1.76 m (5 ft 9 in)
G		(United States)	Dorsett, Brey	1.72 m (5 ft 8 in)
F		(Romania)	Gavra, Ioana (C)	1.79 m (5 ft 10 in)
F/C		(Romania)	Kokovay, Melania	1.82 m (6 ft 0 in)
G		(Romania)	Mangra, Alexandra	1.65 m (5 ft 5 in)

Head coach

- (Romania) Anica, Ioana

Assistant coach(es)

- (Romania) Niculescu, Adriana
  (Romania) Nica, Daniel

Legend

- (C) Team captain
- Injured

- Roster
Updated: 15 September 2018
