= Sepsi Arena Stadium =

Romanian stadium

Sepsi Arena
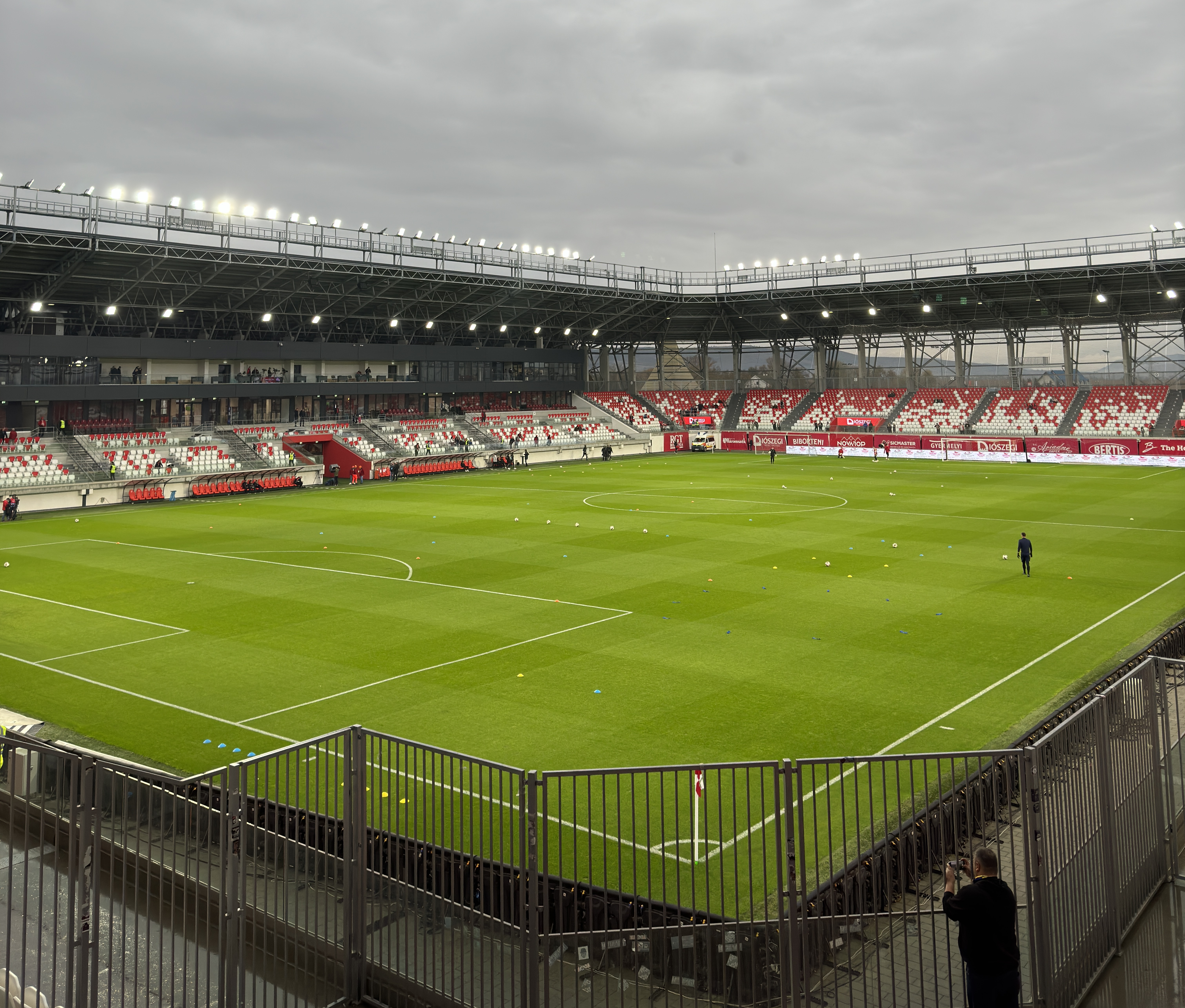
- UEFA
- Interactive map of Sepsi Arena
- Address: Lunca Oltului Street, DN12
- Location: Sfântu Gheorghe, Romania
- Coordinates: 45°53′1″N 25°48′22.6″E
- Owner: Sepsi OSK Sfântu Gheorghe
- Capacity: 8,400
- Surface: Grass

Construction
- Groundbreaking: Summer 2019
- Opened: October 16, 2021
- Cost: €25 million
- Architect: ASA Cons Romania

Tenant
- Sepsi OSK Sfântu Gheorghe (2021–present)

The Sepsi Arena stadium (Romanian: Stadionul Arena Sepsi, Hungarian: Sepsi Aréna Stadion) is a football stadium in Sfântu Gheorghe, Romania. It was opened in October 2021 and primarily serves as the new home stadium of Sepsi OSK Sfântu Gheorghe.

Sepsi played its home matches at Municipal Stadium until the new stadium opened.

The new stadium cost €25 million and seats 8,400 spectators. Construction works began in the summer of 2019, with the date of the opening being October 2021 with a match between Sepsi OSK and FC Voluntari played on 16 October. The building is located next to the Sepsi Arena.

== History ==
The Hungarian government financed the construction of the stadium, after the Romanian government had previously built the Sepsi Arena in the same sports complex of Sfântu Gheorghe and several hockey rinks, in the Székelyföld, through the Compania Națională de Investiții.

== Gallery ==
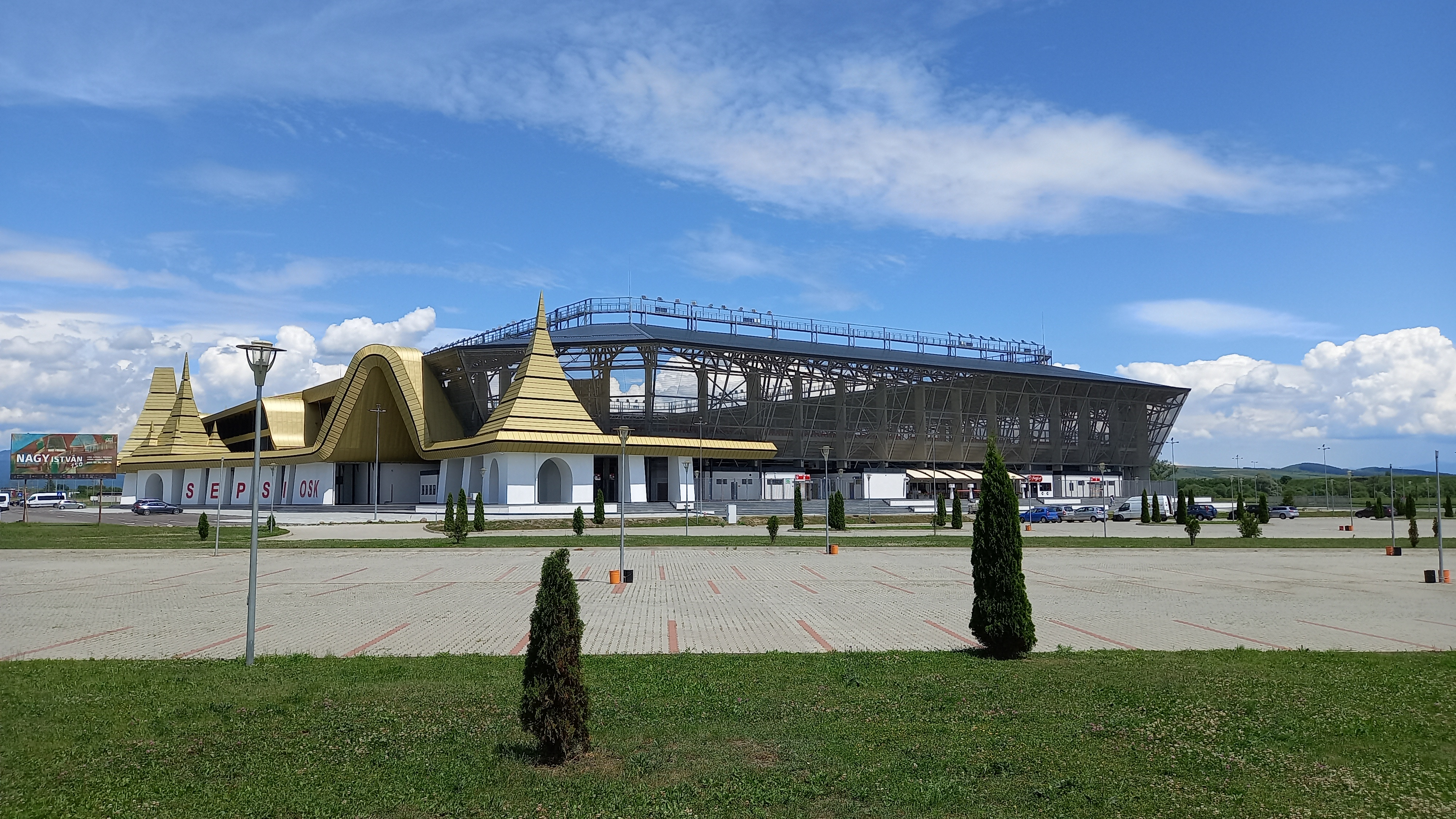
Outside view

== See also ==
- List of football stadiums in Romania
- List of European stadia by capacity
