= Noémie Mayombo =

Belgian basketball player (born 1991)

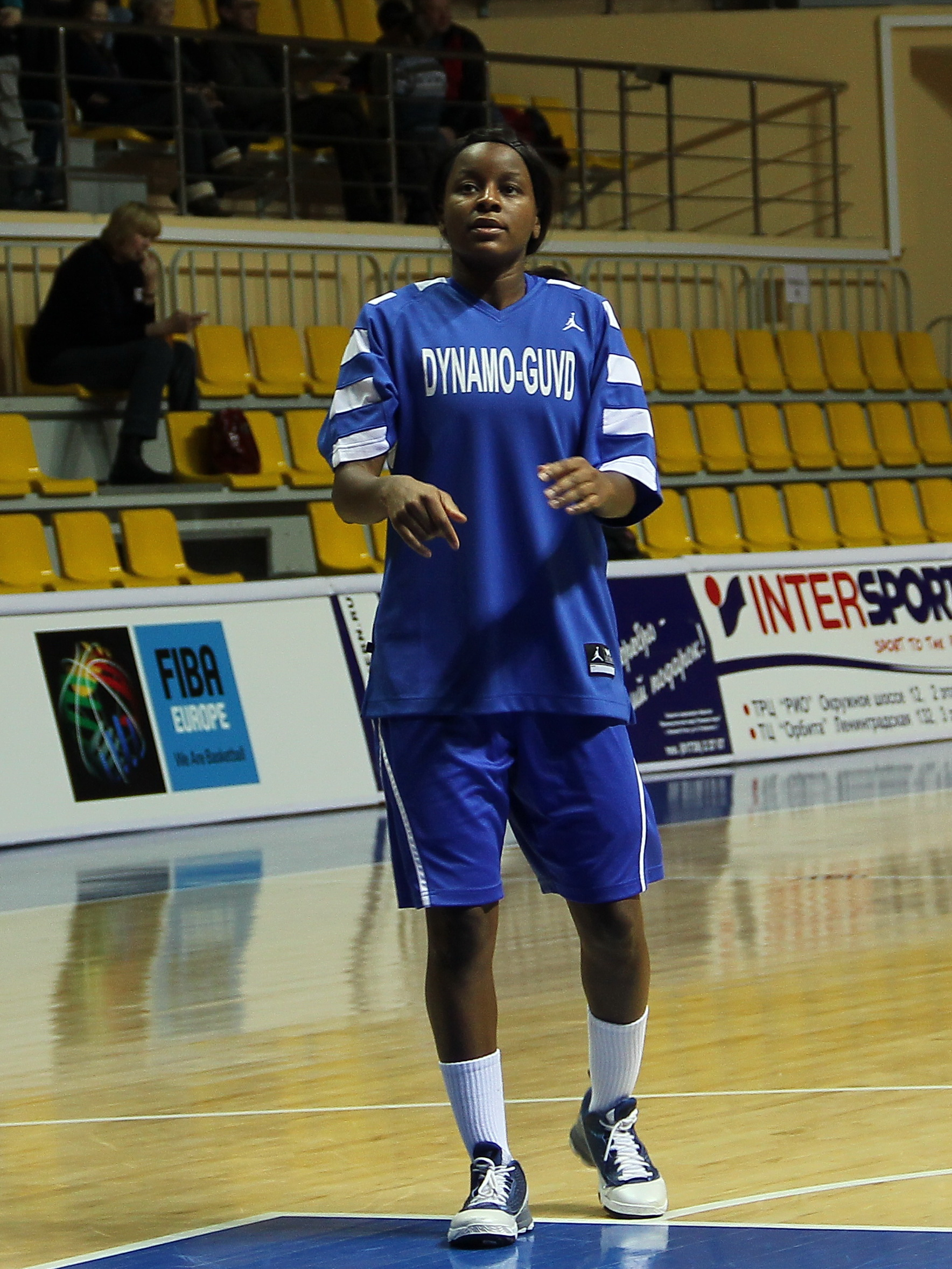
- Mayombo in 2013

Personal information
- Born: 10 February 1991 (age 35) Ottignies-Louvain-la-Neuve, Belgium
- Listed height: 170 cm (5 ft 7 in)
- Listed weight: 62 kg (137 lb)

Career information
- Playing career: 2007–2019
- Position: Point guard
- Number: 20

Noémie Mayombo (born 10 February 1991) is a Belgian basketball player. She plays as a point guard and has played for teams in Belgium, Poland, Russia, Switzerland and Turkey.

== Biography ==
Mayombo was born on 10 February 1991 in Ottignies-Louvain-la-Neuve, Belgium. She has Congolese heritage. She began playing basketball aged 4.

Mayombo played for the Belgium women's national under-20 basketball team, nicknamed the Young Cats, and represented Belgium at the 2007 FIBA Under-21 World Championship for Women placing 5th.

After finishing school, in 2008 Mayombo moved to play basketball and study in Neuchatel, Switzerland, playing for Universite BC Neuchatel in the SB League Women while studying management at the University of Neuchâtel. She returned to Belgium in 2010 and her team made it to the Belgian Women's Basketball League semi-finals in 2012.

Mayombo played for the senior Belgium women's national basketball team, nicknamed Belgian Cats, between 2010 and 2015 and represented Belgium at the qualifications to 2015 European Championships.

Mayombo played in the Russian Women's Basketball Premier League with WBC Dynamo Novosibirsk in 2013. Coach Boris Sokolovsky said of her that:

"…Noemi Mayombo — main point guard of the Belgian national team. She has been playing in Belgium for a long time, I have been watching her for a long time. She was born in 1991, but when I first took part in the European Championship as a coach of the youth team, and this was back in 2006 — she was already playing well for the Belgian youth team and felt quite comfortable on the court. At the moment, she has grown into a good player and is, as I already said, the main point guard of the Belgian national team."

Mayombo played a second season with WBC Dynamo Novosibirsk in 2014 and then a season at Enisey in 2015. During the 2014 season, she was the tenth-highest scorer in the Russian league (13.3 points) and the second-highest passer (4 assists per game). She was given a Eurobasket.com All-Russian PBL Honorable Mention.

In 2016, Mayombo joined the Polish team CCC Polkowice in the EuroLeague Women, then played with Mersin Büyükşehir Belediyesi S.K. in Turkey. Mayombo played for Elfic Fribourg in the Swiss basketball league NLB Women (second-tier level) during 2017 and 2018. Following an ankle injury, she was replaced by Britney Jones.

In 2017, Mayombo did not play with the Belgian Cats in the 2017 European Championships in Czechia due to her ankle injury and was replaced by Serena Lynn-Geldof. She announced that she would be retiring within 5 years. Mayombo retired from professional basketball in 2019.
