= 2018 USA Team Handball Nationals – women's open division =

2018 USA Team Handball Nationals – Women's Open Division
- Season: 2017–18
- Dates: 17 – 20 May 2018
- Champion: Team Rogue
- Matches played: 36
- Goals scored: 1,277 (35.47 per match)
- All statistics correct as of 2018-08-07.

The 2018 Nationals was the 48th Women's Nationals. The Nationals was a team handball tournament to determine the National Champion from 2018 from the US.

== Venues ==
The championship was played at four courts at the Myrtle Beach Sports Center in Myrtle Beach, South Carolina.

Location of the Myrtle Beach Sports Center

== Modus ==
Location of 2018 USA Team Handball Nationals Women's Open Division Teams.

The eleven teams are split in two pools A and B and they play a round roubin.

The last teams per group played a 9-11th place semifinal.

The last third and fourth teams per group were qualified for the 5-8th place semifinals.

The losers from the 5th–8th place semis played a 7th place game and the winners the 5th place game.

The best two teams per group were qualified for the semifinals.

The losers from the semis played a small final and the winners the final.

== Results ==
=== Group stage ===
==== Group A ====
| Team | Pld | W | D | L | GF | GA | GD | Pts |
|---|---|---|---|---|---|---|---|---|
| Team Rogue (1) | 5 | 5 | 0 | 0 | 165 | 73 | +92 | 10 |
| Boston (3т) | 5 | 3 | 1 | 1 | 97 | 68 | +29 | 7 |
| Carolina Blue (NV) | 5 | 2 | 2 | 1 | 89 | 84 | +5 | 6 |
| San Francisco CalHeat (NV) | 5 | 2 | 1 | 2 | 93 | 87 | +6 | 5 |
| Houston Firehawks (3т) | 5 | 1 | 0 | 4 | 70 | 106 | −36 | 2 |
| West Point Gold (NV) | 5 | 0 | 0 | 5 | 45 | 141 | −96 | 0 |

| 17 Mai 2018; 18:30 (UTC-4) | Team Rogue | 28-18 | San Francisco CalHeat | Court 1, Myrtle Beach Sports Center |
| 17 Mai 2018; 18:30 (UTC-4) | | Report | | Court 1, Myrtle Beach Sports Center |

| 17 Mai 2018; 19:45 (UTC-4) | Houston Firehawks | 9-21 | Boston | Court 3, Myrtle Beach Sports Center |
| 17 Mai 2018; 19:45 (UTC-4) | | Report | | Court 3, Myrtle Beach Sports Center |

| 18 Mai 2018; 8:00 (UTC-4) | Team Rogue | 32-16 | Houston Firehawks | Court 2, Myrtle Beach Sports Center |
| 18 Mai 2018; 8:00 (UTC-4) | | Report | | Court 2, Myrtle Beach Sports Center |

| 18 Mai 2018; 9:15 (UTC-4) | West Point Gold | 13-25 | San Francisco CalHeat | Court 3, Myrtle Beach Sports Center |
| 18 Mai 2018; 9:15 (UTC-4) | | Report | | Court 3, Myrtle Beach Sports Center |

| 18 Mai 2018; 9:15 (UTC-4) | Boston | 14-14 | Carolina Blue | Court 4, Myrtle Beach Sports Center |
| 18 Mai 2018; 9:15 (UTC-4) | | Report | | Court 4, Myrtle Beach Sports Center |

| 18 Mai 2018; 13:15 (UTC-4) | Carolina Blue | 17-36 | Team Rogue | Court 1, Myrtle Beach Sports Center |
| 18 Mai 2018; 13:15 (UTC-4) | | Report | | Court 1, Myrtle Beach Sports Center |

| 18 Mai 2018; 14:30 (UTC-4) | West Point Gold | 7-25 | Boston | Court 4, Myrtle Beach Sports Center |
| 18 Mai 2018; 14:30 (UTC-4) | | Report | | Court 4, Myrtle Beach Sports Center |

| 18 Mai 2018; 18:30 (UTC-4) | San Francisco CalHeat | 14-21 | Boston | Court 1, Myrtle Beach Sports Center |
| 18 Mai 2018; 18:30 (UTC-4) | | Report | | Court 1, Myrtle Beach Sports Center |

| 18 Mai 2018; 18:45 (UTC-4) | Houston Firehawks | 13-19 | Carolina Blue | Court 2, Myrtle Beach Sports Center |
| 18 Mai 2018; 18:45 (UTC-4) | | Report | | Court 2, Myrtle Beach Sports Center |

| 18 Mai 2018; 19:45 (UTC-4) | West Point Gold | 6-45 | Team Rogue | Court 4, Myrtle Beach Sports Center |
| 18 Mai 2018; 19:45 (UTC-4) | | Report | | Court 4, Myrtle Beach Sports Center |

| 19 Mai 2018; 8:00 (UTC-4) | West Point Gold | 24-6 | Carolina Blue | Court 3, Myrtle Beach Sports Center |
| 19 Mai 2018; 8:00 (UTC-4) | | Report | | Court 3, Myrtle Beach Sports Center |

| 19 Mai 2018; 9:15 (UTC-4) | San Francisco CalHeat | 21-10 | Houston Firehawks | Court 1, Myrtle Beach Sports Center |
| 19 Mai 2018; 9:15 (UTC-4) | | Report | | Court 1, Myrtle Beach Sports Center |

| 19 Mai 2018; 11:45 (UTC-4) | Boston | 16-24 | Team Rogue | Court 2, Myrtle Beach Sports Center |
| 19 Mai 2018; 11:45 (UTC-4) | | Report | | Court 2, Myrtle Beach Sports Center |

| 19 Mai 2018; 13:00 (UTC-4) | Carolina Blue | 15-15 | San Francisco CalHeat | Court 2, Myrtle Beach Sports Center |
| 19 Mai 2018; 13:00 (UTC-4) | | Report | | Court 2, Myrtle Beach Sports Center |

| 19 Mai 2018; 13:15 (UTC-4) | West Point Gold | 13-22 | Houston Firehawks | Court 1, Myrtle Beach Sports Center |
| 19 Mai 2018; 13:15 (UTC-4) | | Report | | Court 1, Myrtle Beach Sports Center |

==== Group B ====
| Team | Pld | W | D | L | GF | GA | GD | Pts |
|---|---|---|---|---|---|---|---|---|
| New York City (2) | 4 | 4 | 0 | 0 | 90 | 52 | +38 | 8 |
| Québec (NV) | 4 | 3 | 0 | 1 | 90 | 54 | +36 | 6 |
| DC Diplomats (5) | 4 | 2 | 0 | 2 | 83 | 57 | +26 | 4 |
| West Point Black (NV) | 4 | 1 | 0 | 3 | 53 | 100 | −47 | 2 |
| San Francisco CalHeat 2 (NV) | 4 | 0 | 0 | 4 | 34 | 87 | −53 | 0 |

| 17 Mai 2018; 14:30 (UTC-4) | Québec | 12-16 | New York City | Court 4, Myrtle Beach Sports Center |
| 17 Mai 2018; 14:30 (UTC-4) | | Report | | Court 4, Myrtle Beach Sports Center |

| 17 Mai 2018; 21:00 (UTC-4) | DC Diplomats | 26-4 | San Francisco CalHeat 2 | Court 1, Myrtle Beach Sports Center |
| 17 Mai 2018; 21:00 (UTC-4) | | Report | | Court 1, Myrtle Beach Sports Center |

| 18 Mai 2018; 8:00 (UTC-4) | West Point Black | 11-27 | New York City | Court 3, Myrtle Beach Sports Center |
| 18 Mai 2018; 8:00 (UTC-4) | | Report | | Court 3, Myrtle Beach Sports Center |

| 18 Mai 2018; 12:00 (UTC-4) | DC Diplomats | 15-19 | Québec | Court 4, Myrtle Beach Sports Center |
| 18 Mai 2018; 12:00 (UTC-4) | | Report | | Court 4, Myrtle Beach Sports Center |

| 18 Mai 2018; 13:15 (UTC-4) | West Point Black | 16-11 | San Francisco CalHeat 2 | Court 3, Myrtle Beach Sports Center |
| 18 Mai 2018; 13:15 (UTC-4) | | Report | | Court 3, Myrtle Beach Sports Center |

| 18 Mai 2018; 17:30 (UTC-4) | New York City | 24-17 | DC Diplomats | Court 2, Myrtle Beach Sports Center |
| 18 Mai 2018; 17:30 (UTC-4) | | Report | | Court 2, Myrtle Beach Sports Center |

| 18 Mai 2018; 19:45 (UTC-4) | Québec | 22-7 | San Francisco CalHeat 2 | Court 1, Myrtle Beach Sports Center |
| 18 Mai 2018; 19:45 (UTC-4) | | Report | | Court 1, Myrtle Beach Sports Center |

| 19 Mai 2018; 8:00 (UTC-4) | Québec | 37-16 | West Point Black | Court 4, Myrtle Beach Sports Center |
| 19 Mai 2018; 8:00 (UTC-4) | | Report | | Court 4, Myrtle Beach Sports Center |

| 19 Mai 2018; 10:30 (UTC-4) | San Francisco CalHeat 2 | 12-23 | New York City | Court 2, Myrtle Beach Sports Center |
| 19 Mai 2018; 10:30 (UTC-4) | | Report | | Court 2, Myrtle Beach Sports Center |

| 19 Mai 2018; 11:45 (UTC-4) | West Point Black | 10-25 | DC Diplomats | Court 3, Myrtle Beach Sports Center |
| 19 Mai 2018; 11:45 (UTC-4) | | Report | | Court 3, Myrtle Beach Sports Center |

=== Championship ===
Semifinals
A1 | Team Rogue | 25
B2 | Québec | 20
B1 | New York City | 18
A2 | Boston | 14

Final
A1 | Team Rogue | 29
B1 | New York City | 23
Small Final
B2 | Québec | 30
A2 | Boston | 14

==== Semifinals ====
| 19 Mai 2018; 17:30 (UTC-4) | Team Rogue | 25-20 | Québec | Court 2, Myrtle Beach Sports Center |
| 19 Mai 2018; 17:30 (UTC-4) | | Report | | Court 2, Myrtle Beach Sports Center |

| 19 Mai 2018; 18:45 (UTC-4) | New York City | 18-14 | Boston | Court 2, Myrtle Beach Sports Center |
| 19 Mai 2018; 18:45 (UTC-4) | | Report | | Court 2, Myrtle Beach Sports Center |

==== Small Final ====
| 20 Mai 2018; 10:45 (UTC-4) | Québec | 30-14 | Boston | Court 3, Myrtle Beach Sports Center |
| 20 Mai 2018; 10:45 (UTC-4) | | Report | | Court 3, Myrtle Beach Sports Center |

==== Final ====
| 20 Mai 2018; 12:00 (UTC-4) | Team Rogue | 29-23 | New York City | Court 2, Myrtle Beach Sports Center |
| 20 Mai 2018; 12:00 (UTC-4) | | Report | | Court 2, Myrtle Beach Sports Center |

=== Consolation 5-8th Place ===
5-8th Place Semifinals
A3 | Carolina Blue | 20
B4 | West Point Black | 19
B3 | DC Diplomats | 17
A4 | San Francisco CalHeat | 12

5th Place
A3 | Carolina Blue | 16
B3 | DC Diplomats | 20
7th Place
B4 | West Point Black | 12
A4 | San Francisco CalHeat | 19

==== 5-8th Place Semifinals ====
| 19 Mai 2018; 16:00 (UTC-4) | Carolina Blue | 20-19 | West Point Black | Court 3, Myrtle Beach Sports Center |
| 19 Mai 2018; 16:00 (UTC-4) | | Report | | Court 3, Myrtle Beach Sports Center |

| 19 Mai 2018; 16:00 (UTC-4) | DC Diplomats | 17-12 | San Francisco CalHeat | Court 4, Myrtle Beach Sports Center |
| 19 Mai 2018; 16:00 (UTC-4) | | Report | | Court 4, Myrtle Beach Sports Center |

==== 7th Place ====
| 20 Mai 2018; 9:15 (UTC-4) | West Point Black | 12-19 | San Francisco CalHeat | Court 1, Myrtle Beach Sports Center |
| 20 Mai 2018; 9:15 (UTC-4) | | Report | | Court 1, Myrtle Beach Sports Center |

==== 5th Place ====
| 20 Mai 2018; 10:30 (UTC-4) | Carolina Blue | 16-20 | DC Diplomats | Court 1, Myrtle Beach Sports Center |
| 20 Mai 2018; 10:30 (UTC-4) | | Report | | Court 1, Myrtle Beach Sports Center |

=== Consolation 9-11th Place ===
| 9-11th Place Semifinals | | | 9th Place |
| | | | A5 | Houston Firehawks | 15 |
| B5 | San Francisco CalHeat 2 | 21 | B5 | San Francisco CalHeat 2 | 17 |
| A6 | West Point Gold | 7 |

==== 9-11th Place Semifinal ====
| 19 Mai 2018; 17:15 (UTC-4) | San Francisco CalHeat 2 | 21-7 | West Point Gold | Court 3, Myrtle Beach Sports Center |
| 19 Mai 2018; 17:15 (UTC-4) | | Report | | Court 3, Myrtle Beach Sports Center |

==== 9th Place ====
| 20 Mai 2018; 8:00 (UTC-4) | Houston Firehawks | 15-17 | San Francisco CalHeat 2 | Court 1, Myrtle Beach Sports Center |
| 20 Mai 2018; 8:00 (UTC-4) | | Report | | Court 1, Myrtle Beach Sports Center |

== Final ranking ==
| Rank | Team |
|---|---|
| 1st place, gold medalist(s) | Team Rogue |
| 2nd place, silver medalist(s) | New York City THC |
| 3rd place, bronze medalist(s) | Québec |
| 4 | Boston THC |
| 5 | DC Diplomats |
| 6 | Carolina Blue |
| 7 | San Francisco CalHeat |
| 8 | West Point Black |
| 9 | San Francisco CalHeat 2 |
| 10 | Firehawks THC |
| 11 | West Point Gold |

== Statistics ==
=== Awards ===
| Most Valuable Player: | Cecile Balanche | DC Diplomats |
| Most Valuable Goalkeeper: | Georgeta Marincas | Carolina Blue |
| Top Scorer: | Jence Ann Rhoads | Team Rogue |

=== Top scorers ===
| Rank | Name | Goals | Games | Average | Team |
|---|---|---|---|---|---|
| 1st place, gold medalist(s) | Jence Ann Rhoads | 53 | 7 | 7.57 | Team Rogue |
| 2nd place, silver medalist(s) | Cecile Balanche | 45 | 6 | 7.5 | DC Diplomats |
| 3rd place, bronze medalist(s) | Kathleen Darling | 41 | 7 | 5.86 | Team Rogue |
| 4 | Ekaterina Martsul | 40 | 7 | 5.71 | Houston Firehawks |
| 5 | Helen Moser | 38 | 6 | 6.33 | New York City THC |
| 6 | Zoe Lombard | 33 | 7 | 4.71 | Team Rogue |
| 7 | Binta Jau | 32 | 7 | 4.57 | Boston |
| 8 | Kathrine Agger | 29 | 7 | 4.14 | San Francisco CalHeat |
| 9 | Constance Duvert | 27 | 6 | 4.5 | San Francisco CalHeat II |
| 10 | KiAnna Duncan | 26 | 6 | 4.33 | West Point Black |

=== All-Tournament Team ===
Pivot

Helen Moser

New York City THC

Center Back

Left Back
Jence Ann Rhoads
Right Back

Binta Jau
Team Rogue
Kathleen Darling

Boston Team Handball Club

Team Rogue

Left Wing

Goalkeeper

Right Wing
Cecile Balanche

Georgeta Marincas

Zoe Lombard
DC Diplomats

Carolina Blue

Team Rogue

Most Valuable Goalkeeper
