= BC Sportul Studentesc Bucharest =

BC Sportul Studentesc Bucharest is a basketball club from Bucharest. Its women's team, which plays in the Divizia A, won three national championships in a row between 1975 and 1977, and it made several appearances in FIBA competitions until 1995.

== Titles ==
- Divizia A (3)
  - 1975, 1976, 1977
- Cupa României (1)
  - 1976

== 2012-13 roster ==
- (1.90) (Serbia) Vladinka Erak
- (1.88) (Montenegro) Sanja Knezević
- (1.87) (Romania) Roxana Bejan
- (1.87) (Romania) Adina Lovasz
- (1.87) (Romania) Cristina Perta
- (1.86) (Bosnia and Herzegovina) Emina Demirović
- (1.85) (Serbia) Milica Beljanski
- (1.82) (Romania) Taisia Lungu
- (1.78) (Serbia) Nikolina Nikolić
- (1.75) (United States) Brandie Hoskins
- (1.72) (Romania) Liliana Otrocol
- (1.71) (Romania) Florentina Ardeleanu
- (1.68) (Serbia) Marina Ristić
