= Melinda Hale =

American handball player

Personal information
- Nationality: American
- Born: 19 April 1955 (age 71) Oil City, Pennsylvania
- Height: 1.72 m (5 ft 8 in)

Sport
- Sport: Handball
National team
- Years: Team
- 1975-1984: United States
- Updated on 19 April 2018

Melinda Ann Rhoads (née Hale; born April 19, 1955) is an American former handball player who played with the United States women's national handball team at the 1984 Summer Olympics.

== Personal life ==
Rhoads is married to former professional basketball player Robert Rhoads. Their daughter, Jence Ann Rhoads, is a former professional basketball player and a member of the United States national handball team.
