= CS Agronomia București (women's basketball) =

Romanian basketball club

Agronomia București
- Leagues: Liga Națională
- Founded: 2009; 16 years ago
- Arena: Arena de Baschet
- Capacity: 350
- Location: Bucharest, Romania
- Team colors: White, Green
- President: Zoltan Sáfár-Gîngu
- Head coach: Nebojša Biro
Home	Away

Clubul Sportiv Agronomia București, commonly known as CS Agronomia București or simply Agronomia București, is a Romanian women's basketball club based in Bucharest, currently participates in the Liga Națională, the top-tier league in Romania.

The club initially played in the second-tier Liga I. However, in 2018 the league was merged with the top-tier Liga Națională.

== Current roster ==
Note: Flags indicate national team eligibility at FIBA-sanctioned events. Players may hold other non-FIBA nationalities not displayed.

Agronomia București roster
Players	Coaches
Pos. / No. / Nat. / Name; G / 33 / (United States) / Charles, Jazmine / 1.75 m (5 ft 9 in)	Head coach: (Serbia) Biro, Nebojša; Legend: (C) Team captain; Injured; Roster; Updated: 14 September 2018
