= KSE Târgu Secuiesc (women's basketball) =

- Leagues: Liga Națională
- Founded: 2008; 17 years ago
- History: KSE Târgu Secuiesc (2008–present)
- Arena: Sala Sporturilor
- Capacity: 200
- Location: Târgu Secuiesc, Romania
- Team colors: White, Blue
- Head coach: Ljubomir Kolarević
Home	Away

Asociația Clubul Sportiv Târgu Secuiesc, (Hungarian: Kézdivásárhely Sportegyesület) commonly known mainly after its Hungarian name as KSE Târgu Secuiesc or simply KSE, is a Romanian women's basketball club based in Târgu Secuiesc, currently participates in the Liga Națională, the top-tier league in Romania.

The club initially played in the second-tier Liga I. However, in 2018 the league was merged with the top-tier Liga Națională.

== Current roster ==
Note: Flags indicate national team eligibility at FIBA-sanctioned events. Players may hold other non-FIBA nationalities not displayed.

KSE Târgu Secuiesc roster
Players	Coaches
Pos. / No. / Nat. / Name; F / / (United States) / Mobley, Kayla (C) / 1.80 m (5 ft 11 in)	Head coach: (Serbia) Kolarević, Ljubomir; Legend: (C) Team captain; Injured; Roster; Updated: 15 September 2018
