= CS Politehnica Iași =

Romanian sports society

- Full name: Clubul Sportiv Politehnica Iasi
- Nicknames: Alb-albaștrii (The White and Blues)
- Founded: 1967; 59 years ago
- Colours: White, Blue
- Chairman: Vasile Manole
- Website: Official website

CS Politehnica Iași is a Romanian sports society from Iași, Romania, founded in 1967. The team competes in the Divizia A, the second tier of the Romanian men's handball league system. Since the 2015–16 season, the team has been coached by Costel Schender.
