= BC Sirius Mureșul Târgu Mureș =

Romanian basketball club

- Nickname: Mureșencele (Women from Mureș County)
- Leagues: Liga Națională
- Founded: 2007; 19 years ago
- History: BC Sirius (2007–2018); CSM Târgu Mureș (2018–2019); BC Sirius (2019–present)
- Arena: Sala Sporturilor
- Capacity: 2,000
- Location: Târgu Mureș, Romania
- Team colors: White, Red
- President: István Kiss
- Head coach: Carmin Artemie Popa
- Website: Website
Home	Away

BC Sirius Mureșul Târgu Mureș is a Romanian women basketball club based in Târgu Mureș, currently competing in the Liga Națională, the top-tier league in Romania. The team was founded as BC Sirius in 2007 and was incorporated into the municipal sports club of Târgu Mureș in the summer of 2018, being renamed as CSM Târgu Mureș. However, it reverted to its original name one year later, following financial issues reported within the local administration.

== Honours ==
Liga I

Winners (1): 2015–16

== Current roster ==
Note: Flags indicate national team eligibility at FIBA-sanctioned events. Players may hold other non-FIBA nationalities not displayed.

BC Sirius Târgu Mureș roster
Players
Coaches

Pos.	No.	Nat.	Name	Ht.	Age
PF	1	(United States)	Garrett, Tazsa	1.80 m (5 ft 11 in)	27 – 28 January 1999
	2	(Romania)	Czimbalmos, Timea		25 – 2 February 2001
PG	4	(United States)	Cooper, Keilanei	1.75 m (5 ft 9 in)	27 – 8 January 1999
SG	6	(Romania)	Feiseș, Andreea	1.80 m (5 ft 11 in)	26 – 1 December 1999
	7	(Romania)	Oancea, Antonia		21 – 1 March 2005
	8	(Romania)	Moga, Oana		20 – 27 December 2005
C	9	(Serbia)	Podunavac, Anastasija	1.85 m (6 ft 1 in)	29 – 30 January 1997
SG	10	(Romania)	Lipovan, Rebecca	1.70 m (5 ft 7 in)	24 – 28 February 2002
F	11	(Ukraine)	Horobets, Vita	1.80 m (5 ft 11 in)	30 – 6 April 1996
F	14	(Romania)	Ciociovan, Adina	1.88 m (6 ft 2 in)	24 – 30 July 2001
C	15	(Bosnia and Herzegovina)	Bucuk, Merjema	1.86 m (6 ft 1 in)	25 – 17 April 2001
F	20	(Romania)	Szász, Réka
	30	(Romania)	Mircea, Viana		23 – 22 March 2003
F	30	(Austria)	Sólyom, Sára	1.78 m (5 ft 10 in)	26 – 20 January 2000

Head coach

- (Romania) Carmin Artemie Popa

Assistant coach(es)

- (Romania) Ionel Brustur

Legend

- (C) Team captain
- Injured

- Roster
