= CSM Satu Mare (basketball) =

Basketball team in Satu Mare, Romania

- Nickname: Sătmărencele (Women from Satu Mare)
- Leagues: Liga Națională
- Founded: 2007; 18 years ago
- History: CSM Satu Mare (2007–present)
- Arena: Ecaterina Both
- Capacity: 400
- Location: Satu Mare, Romania
- Team colors: white, red
- President: Vasile Fogel
- Head coach: Marius Dobă
- Website: Official website
Home	Away

CSM Satu Mare is a Romania professional women's basketball club that is based in Satu Mare. The club competes in the Liga Națională.

== Honours ==
Liga Națională

Runners-up (4): 2010–11, 2011–12, 2017–18, 2018–19

Romanian Cup

Runners-up (4): 2009–10, 2010–11, 2018–19, 2021–22

== Current roster ==
Note: Flags indicate national team eligibility at FIBA-sanctioned events. Players may hold other non-FIBA nationalities not displayed.

CSM Satu Mare roster
Players
Coaches

Pos.	No.	Nat.	Name	Ht.
F	4	(United States)	Reed, Chastity	1.85 m (6 ft 1 in)
G	6	(Romania)	Pop, Adina	1.73 m (5 ft 8 in)
G/F	7	(Hungary)	Olah, Andreea (C)	1.81 m (5 ft 11 in)
G	9	(Romania)	Szmutku, Renata	1.70 m (5 ft 7 in)
SG	11	(Romania)	Ferenczi, Flavia	1.75 m (5 ft 9 in)
F/C	15	(United States)	Whittington, Khadijah	1.85 m (6 ft 1 in)
G/F	17	(Romania)	Bolba, Valentina	1.70 m (5 ft 7 in)
SF	20	(Romania)	Uiuiu, Alexandra	1.83 m (6 ft 0 in)
PG	23	(Romania)	Laza, Ramona	1.73 m (5 ft 8 in)
F/C	24	(Serbia)	Baltić, Kristina	1.90 m (6 ft 3 in)
G	25	(United States)	Batey, Morgan	1.78 m (5 ft 10 in)
G	32	(United States)	Ballard, Danielle	1.75 m (5 ft 9 in)
G	33	(Bosnia and Herzegovina)	Tavić, Matea	1.78 m (5 ft 10 in)

Head coach

- (Romania) Marius Dobă

Assistant coach(es)

- (Romania) Octavian Boian

Legend

- (C) Team captain
- Injured

- Roster
Updated: 13 February 2017
