= Sepsi Arena =

Arena in Sfântu Gheorghe, Romania

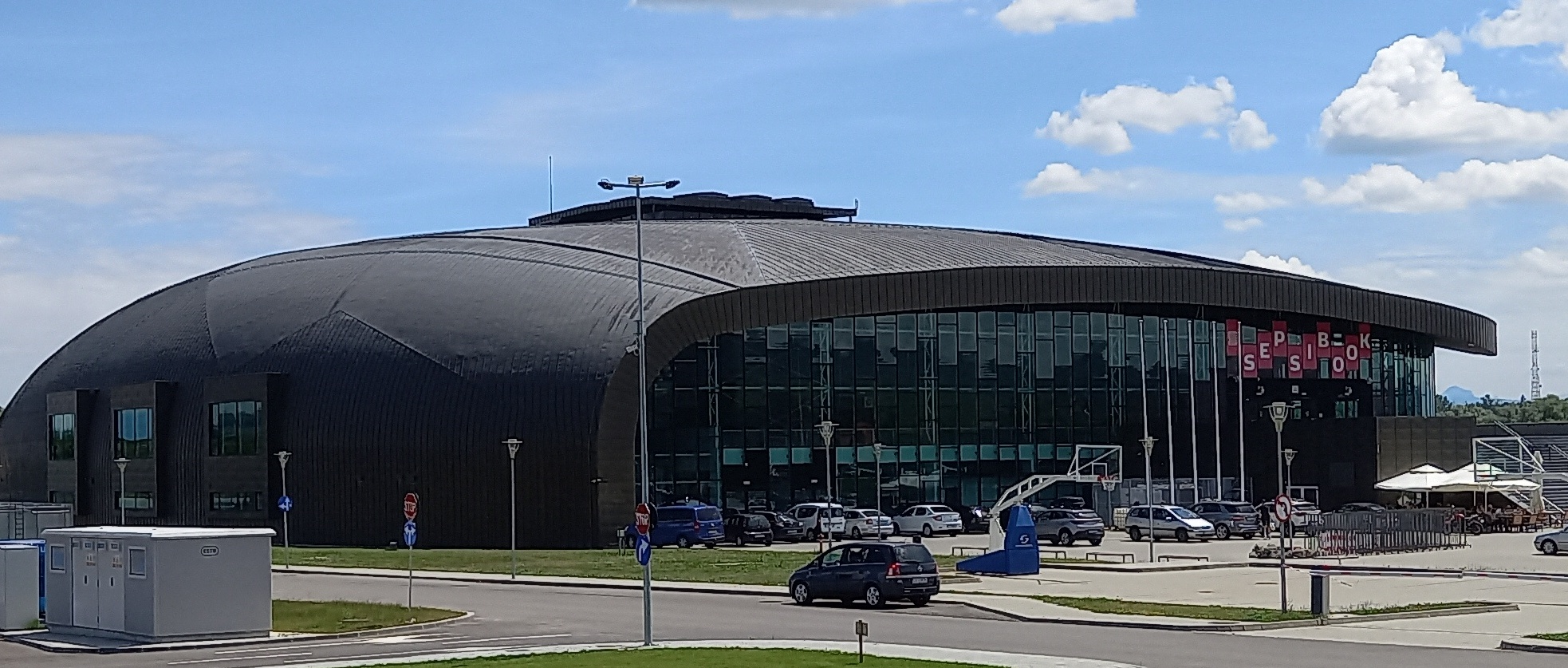
- Location: Sfântu Gheorghe, Romania
- Owner: Sfântu Gheorghe Town Hall
- Capacity: Basketball: 3,000; Ice hockey: 2,500

Construction
- Opened: August 2017
- Cost: €19 million
- Architect: ACI Cluj
- General contractor: Compania Națională de Investiții

Tenant
- ACS Sepsi SIC (Liga Națională)

Sepsi Arena is a multi-purpose indoor arena in Sfântu Gheorghe, Romania. The building is located next to the Stadionul Sepsi.

== See also ==
- List of indoor arenas in Romania

| Preceded by Sala Transilvania | Romanian Basketball Cup; Venue; 2018 | Succeeded by BTarena |

| Preceded by Sala Polivalentă | Romanian Handball Cup; Venue; 2020 | Succeeded by TBD |
