= SCM Timișoara (women's basketball) =

- Nickname: Tmișorencele (Women from Timișoara)
- Leagues: Liga Națională
- Founded: 2016
- Dissolved: 2018
- History: SCM Timișoara (2016–2018)
- Arena: Constantin Jude
- Capacity: 2,200
- Location: Timișoara, Romania
- Team colors: White, Purple, Gold
- Website: Official Website
Home	Away

Sport Club Municipal Timișoara, commonly known as SCM Timișoara, was a professional women's basketball team from Timișoara, Romania.

The team was founded in the summer of 2016 to continue the women's basketball tradition in Timișoara after the dissolution of the old team, BCM Danzio. The team was dissolved at only two years after its foundation.

== Honours ==
Liga I

Winners (1): 2016–17
