= CS Rapid București (women's basketball) =

Romanian basketball club

Rapid București
- Leagues: Liga Națională
- Founded: 1934; 92 years ago
- History: CFR București (1934–1937); Rapid București (1937–1945); CFR București (1945–1950); Locomotiva CFR (1950–1958); Rapid București (1958–present)
- Arena: Sala Rapid
- Capacity: 1,500
- Location: Bucharest, Romania
- Team colors: White, Burgundy
- President: Valy Caciuriac
- Head coach: Dan Militaru
- Championships: 10 Romanian Leagues
- Website: clubulrapid.ro
Home	Away

Clubul Sportiv Rapid București, commonly known as CS Rapid București, Rapid București, or simply Rapid, is a Romanian basketball club based in Bucharest, currently participates in the Liga Națională, the top-tier league in Romania. The team represents the basketball women's section of CS Rapid București, a multi-sports club.

Women's basketball section of Rapid was one of the Romanian leading teams during the communist era, winning nine national titles in 1951, 1952, 1962, 1965, 1969, 1972 and 1978. The team also won two Romanian Cups in 1969 and 1995. 2001 marked its last appearance in FIBA competitions to date, in the Ronchetti Cup.

== Honours ==
- Liga Națională

Champions (10): 1951, 1952, 1960, 1961, 1962, 1965, 1969, 1972, 1978, 2026
Runners-up (1): 1998

- Cupa României

Champions (3): 1969, 1995, 2026

== Current roster ==
Note: Flags indicate national team eligibility at FIBA-sanctioned events. Players may hold other non-FIBA nationalities not displayed.

CS Rapid București roster
Players
Coaches

Pos.	No.	Nat.	Name	Ht.	Age
F	1	(Romania)	Cuic, Claudia	1.83 m (6 ft 0 in)	37 – 5 August 1989
F	3	(Romania)	Tănase, Daria Maria		20 – 31 March 2006
G	5	(Bosnia and Herzegovina)	Delić, Anđela	1.85 m (6 ft 1 in)	29 – 1 November 1996
F	6	(Romania)	Nan, Bianca	1.83 m (6 ft 0 in)	25 – 5 February 2001
G	7	(Romania)	Ghizila, Ioana	1.73 m (5 ft 8 in)	29 – 2 June 1997
F	9	(Romania)	Zane, Elena-Agnes	1.80 m (5 ft 11 in)	20 – 7 September 2006
C	11	(Chile)	Morrison, Ziomara	1.91 m (6 ft 3 in)	37 – 15 February 1989
PF/C	17	(Romania)	Orban, Nicolett	1.91 m (6 ft 3 in)	26 – 3 June 2000
G	21	(Romania)	Părău, Annemarie	1.74 m (5 ft 9 in)	42 – 8 March 1984
PG	24	(United States)	Dean, Japreece	1.65 m (5 ft 5 in)	30 – 4 June 1996
SF	31	(Belgium)	Lisowa-Mbaka, Maxuella	1.78 m (5 ft 10 in)	25 – 14 May 2001
SF	33	(Slovakia)	Páleníková, Terézia	1.78 m (5 ft 10 in)	31 – 16 August 1995
SG	77	(Romania)	Nagy-Voica, Bianca	1.70 m (5 ft 7 in)	35 – 4 January 1991
SF		(Romania)	Stan, Bianca-Ioana	1.73 m (5 ft 8 in)	16 – 23 March 2010
F		(Romania)	Ticu, Virginia	1.79 m (5 ft 10 in)	17 – 6 January 2009

Head coach

- (Romania) Emilian Alexandru Olteanu

Assistant coach(es)

- (Romania) Volha Tamirgeanu

Legend

- (C) Team captain
- Injured

- Roster
Updated: 7 October 2026
