= CS Phoenix Constanța =

Phoenix Constanța
- Leagues: Liga Națională
- Founded: 2008; 17 years ago
- History: Phoenix Constanța (2008–present)
- Arena: Sala Sporturilor
- Capacity: 2,100
- Location: Constanța, Romania
- Team colors: Orange, Yellow
- President: Cristian Mănăstireanu
- Head coach: Cristian Mănăstireanu
Home	Away

Clubul Sportiv Phoenix Constanța, commonly known as Phoenix Constanța, is a Romanian women's basketball club based in Constanța, currently participates in the Liga Națională, the top-tier league in Romania.

The club initially played in the second-tier Liga I. However, in 2018 the league was merged with the top-tier Liga Națională.

== Current roster ==
Note: Flags indicate national team eligibility at FIBA-sanctioned events. Players may hold other non-FIBA nationalities not displayed.

Phoenix Constanța roster
Players	Coaches
Pos. / No. / Nat. / Name; G / / (United States) / Douglas, Chelsea (C) / 1.65 m (5 ft 5 in)	Head coach: (Romania) Mănăstireanu, Cristian; Legend: (C) Team captain; Injured; Roster; Updated: 15 September 2018
