= CS Politehnica Național Iași =

Professional women's basketball team from Romania

- Nickname: Alb-Albastrele (The White and Blues)
- Leagues: Liga Națională
- Founded: 1967; 58 years ago
- History: CS Politehnica Iași (1967–2005); CS Național Iași (2005–2009); CS Politehnica Național Iași (2009–present)
- Arena: Polyvalent Hall
- Capacity: 1,500
- Location: Iași, Romania
- Team colors: White, Blue
- President: Vasile Manole
- Head coach: Ovidiu Stochici
- Website: Official website
Home	Away

CS Politehnica Național Iași is a professional women's basketball team from Iași, Romania. The team plays in the Liga Națională, following their 2015–16 Liga I second place and promotion.

== Honours ==
Liga I

Winners (1): 2004–05
Runners-up (1): 2015–16

== Current roster ==
Note: Flags indicate national team eligibility at FIBA-sanctioned events. Players may hold other non-FIBA nationalities not displayed.

CS Politehnica Național Iași roster
Players
Coaches

Pos.	No.	Nat.	Name	Ht.
PG	5	(Romania)	Dănălache, Ramona	1.67 m (5 ft 6 in)
G	7	(Romania)	Pânzaru, Anamaria	1.70 m (5 ft 7 in)
G	7	(Romania)	Dănilă, Diana	1.70 m (5 ft 7 in)
G	11	(United States)	Simmons, Ka-Deidre	1.73 m (5 ft 8 in)
F/C	13	(Romania)	Aursulesei, Andreea	1.82 m (6 ft 0 in)
F	14	(Romania)	Iftimescu, Ioana	1.75 m (5 ft 9 in)
C	15	(Romania)	Ciotîr, Anamaria	1.82 m (6 ft 0 in)
F	17	(Romania)	Butnariu, Roxana	1.75 m (5 ft 9 in)
F	18	(Romania)	Popa, Mihaela.	1.75 m (5 ft 9 in)
G	19	(Romania)	Tevelei, Oana	1.70 m (5 ft 7 in)
C	95	(Romania)	Măgurean, Gabriela (C)	1.90 m (6 ft 3 in)

Head coach

- (Romania) Stochici Ovidiu

Assistant coach(es)

- (Romania) Nănescu Sorana

Legend

- (C) Team captain
- Injured

- Roster
Updated: 19 February 2017
