= CSM Alexandria (women's basketball) =

- Nickname: Teleormănencele (Women from Teleorman County)
- Leagues: Liga Națională
- Founded: 1986; 39 years ago
- History: CS Teleorman Alexandria (1986–2005); CSBT Alexandria (2005–2018); CSM Alexandria (2018–present)
- Arena: Dimitrie Ghica
- Capacity: 900
- Location: Alexandria, Romania
- Team colors: Green, Navy, White
- President: Slabescu Serban
- Head coach: Mădălin Piperea, Voicu Calin
- Website: www.facebook.com/Club-Sportiv-Municipal-Alexandria-2012909575470156/
Home	Away

Former logo, as CSBT Alexandria.

Clubul Sportiv Municipal Alexandria, commonly known as CSM Alexandria or simply as Alexandria, is a professional women's basketball team from Alexandria, Romania. The team plays in the Liga Națională.

The team was in the final of the Romanian Cup in 2009.

In the summer of 2018 CSBT Alexandria was moved to the sports club of Alexandria, CSM Alexandria, club which was founded in the same summer.

== Honours ==
Romanian Cup

Runners-up (1): 2008–09

== Current roster ==
Note: Flags indicate national team eligibility at FIBA-sanctioned events. Players may hold other non-FIBA nationalities not displayed.

CSM Alexandria roster
Players
Coaches

Pos.	No.	Nat.	Name	Ht.
PG	4	(Romania)	Ispas, Eliza	1.70 m (5 ft 7 in)
G/F	5	(Romania)	Candoi, Ștefana	1.70 m (5 ft 7 in)
PG	6	(United States)	Arnold, Shanita	1.65 m (5 ft 5 in)
C	8	(Romania)	Enache, Irina	1.81 m (5 ft 11 in)
G	11	(Romania)	Dușman, Giulia	1.70 m (5 ft 7 in)
PG	13	(Romania)	Manea, Teodora	1.60 m (5 ft 3 in)
C	14	(Romania)	Voicu, Georgiana (C)	1.89 m (6 ft 2 in)
PG	19	(Romania)	Mihai, Mihaela	1.69 m (5 ft 7 in)
G	22	(United States)	Rule, Tori	1.73 m (5 ft 8 in)
G	23	(Romania)	Podar, Alina	1.69 m (5 ft 7 in)
F	32	(United States)	Mullings, Megan	1.86 m (6 ft 1 in)
G/F	50	(Serbia)	Grbić, Ivana	1.82 m (6 ft 0 in)
F/C	94	(United States)	Bartee, Carla	1.82 m (6 ft 0 in)

Head coach

- (Romania) Piperea Mădălin

Assistant coach(es)

- (Romania) Voicu Călin

Legend

- (C) Team captain
- Injured

- Roster
Updated: 13 February 2017
