= CS Phoenix Galați (women's basketball) =

- Nickname: Gălățencele (Women from Galați)
- Leagues: Liga Națională
- Founded: 2000; 25 years ago
- History: CS Phoenix Galați (2012–present)
- Arena: Dunărea
- Capacity: 1,500
- Location: Galați, Romania
- Team colors: Red, Blue, White
- President: Florin Nini
- Team manager: Alexandru Stanciu
- Head coach: Eugenio Rodrigues
- Ownership: Galați Municipality
- Website: Official website
Home	Away

CS Phoenix Galați is a professional women's basketball team from Galați, Romania. The team plays in the Liga Națională, following their championship in the Liga I in 2013.

== Trophies ==
Liga I

Winners (1): 2012–13

== Current roster ==
Note: Flags indicate national team eligibility at FIBA-sanctioned events. Players may hold other non-FIBA nationalities not displayed.

CS Phoenix Galați roster
Players
Coaches

Pos.	No.	Nat.	Name	Ht.
G	4	(United States)	Rutan, Katharine	1.73 m (5 ft 8 in)
G/F	5	(Romania)	Filip, Romina (C)	1.74 m (5 ft 9 in)
F	6	(Romania)	Fota, Bianca	1.74 m (5 ft 9 in)
F	8	(Romania)	Fota, Denisa	1.74 m (5 ft 9 in)
G	10	(Romania)	Dumitrache, Alexandra	1.70 m (5 ft 7 in)
G	14	(Romania)	Grigoraș, Florentina	1.70 m (5 ft 7 in)
G	15	(United States)	Jackson, Jeanette	1.70 m (5 ft 7 in)
F	22	(United States)	Nelson, Kerah	1.80 m (5 ft 11 in)
F	23	(United States)	Covile, Erica	1.85 m (6 ft 1 in)
G/F	24	(United States)	McKenzie, Mayneshia	1.83 m (6 ft 0 in)
F	25	(United States)	Steelnholdt, Shanice	1.83 m (6 ft 0 in)

Head coach

- (Portugal) Rodrigues Eugenio

Assistant coach(es)

- (Romania) Șoptică Andreea

Legend

- (C) Team captain
- Injured

- Roster
Updated: 17 February 2017
