= Olimpia CSU Brașov =

Romanian women's basketball team

Olimpia CSU Braşov
- Nickname: Olimpicele (The Olympians); Alb-Albastrele (The White and Blues)
- Leagues: Liga Națională
- Founded: 2008; 17 years ago
- History: BC Galactica Brașov (2008–2010); BC Galactica Olimpia Brașov (2010–2012); Olimpia CSU Brașov (2012–present)
- Arena: Dumitru Popescu Colibași
- Capacity: 2,000
- Location: Brașov, Romania
- Team colors: White, Blue
- President: Gabriel Calancea
- Head coach: Dan Calancea
- Website: Official Website
Home	Away

Former logo.

Olimpia CSU Braşov is a professional women's basketball team from Brașov, Romania. The club plays in the Liga Națională and its home arena is Dumitru Popescu Colibași Sports Hall.

== Honours ==
Cupa României

Runners-up (2): 2015–16, 2016–17

Liga I

Winners (1): 2009–10

== Notable players ==
Criteria

To appear in this section a player must have either:

- Played at least three seasons for the club.
- Set a club record or won an individual award while at the club.
- Played at least one official international match for their national team at any time.
- Played at least one official WNBA match at any time.

- (United States) Britney Jones
