= Ecaterina Both Arena =

- Interactive map of Ecaterina Both Arena
- Location: Satu Mare, Romania
- Coordinates: 47°47′24″N 22°53′24″E
- Owner: City of Satu Mare
- Capacity: 400

Construction
- Opened: 1983

Tenant
- CSM Satu Mare sports club

Ecaterina Both Arena (Romanian: Sala de sport a Liceului cu Program Sportiv) is an indoor arena in the north-western Romanian city of Satu Mare. It was built in 1983.

In 2013, the arena changed its name to "Ecaterina Both", after the Satu Mare and national team basketball player Ecaterina Both.

It is the home for the matches of the CSM Satu Mare sports club that includes volleyball, basketball and handball.
