= CS Universitatea Cluj-Napoca (women's basketball) =

- Nickname: Șepcile roșii (The Red Caps); Studentele (The Students); Alb-Negrele (The White and Blacks)
- Leagues: Liga Națională
- Founded: 1947; 78 years ago
- History: CS Univ. Cluj-Napoca (1947–present)
- Arena: Polyvalent Hall; Horia Demian
- Capacity: 7,308; 2,525
- Location: Cluj-Napoca, Romania
- Team colors: White, Black
- President: Sorin Grozav
- Head coach: Dragan Petričević
- Championships: 14 Romanian Leagues
- Website: Official Website
Home	Away

CS Universitatea Cluj-Napoca is a professional women's basketball team from Cluj-Napoca, Romania. The club plays in the Liga Națională.

== History ==
CS Universitatea Cluj-Napoca is the oldest and the most successful Liga Națională team. Founded in 1947, in Cluj-Napoca, the club won not less than 14 Romanian Leagues, between 1953 and 1993. In the 80's they won the league in almost every year except 1980 and 1983 when the league was won by 2 teams from Bucharest, Politehnica and Voința. After 13 years of domination U Cluj entered in a regress period and have not won any trophy from 1993, but still remain the team with the most Leagues won in Romanian women's basketball.

== Honours ==
Liga Națională

Winners (14): 1952–53, 1953–54, 1980–81, 1981–82, 1983–84, 1984–85, 1985–86, 1986–87, 1987–88, 1988–89, 1989–90, 1990–91, 1991–92, 1992–93,

== Current roster ==
Note: Flags indicate national team eligibility at FIBA-sanctioned events. Players may hold other non-FIBA nationalities not displayed.

CS Universitatea Cluj-Napoca roster
Players
Coaches

Pos.	No.	Nat.	Name	Ht.
PG	5	(Romania)	Sfîrlea, Marina	1.70 m (5 ft 7 in)
G/F	8	(Romania)	Voica, Bianca	1.70 m (5 ft 7 in)
PG	9	(Romania)	Maxim, Mihaela	1.67 m (5 ft 6 in)
F/C	10	(Romania)	Neagu, Teodora	1.82 m (6 ft 0 in)
SF	11	(Romania)	Irimia, Gabriela. (C)	1.77 m (5 ft 10 in)
PF	15	(Romania)	Cutaș, Cristiana	1.88 m (6 ft 2 in)
F/C	23	(Romania)	Părău, Irina	1.83 m (6 ft 0 in)
F/C	24	(Nigeria)	Agunbiade, Omowumi	1.88 m (6 ft 2 in)
G	25	(United States)	Harrison, Taneisha	1.82 m (6 ft 0 in)
F	29	(Romania)	Mandache, Andra	1.85 m (6 ft 1 in)
C	32	(United States)	Denson, Brittany	1.90 m (6 ft 3 in)
PG	33	(United States)	Ross, Adrianne	1.73 m (5 ft 8 in)
SG	55	(Serbia)	Butulja, Dajana	1.76 m (5 ft 9 in)

Head coach

- (Serbia) Petričević Dragan

Assistant coach(es)

- (Romania) Coldea Mihai

Legend

- (C) Team captain
- Injured

- Roster
Updated: 18 February 2017
