= Sala Sporturilor (Târgu Mureș) =

Coordinates: 43.5500°N 24.5518°E

Sala Sporturilor Târgu Mureș
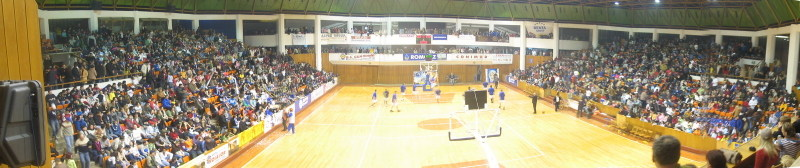
- Sala Sporturilor Târgu Mureș Arena
- Interactive map of Sala Sporturilor Târgu Mureș
- Location: Târgu Mureș, Romania
- Capacity: 2,000

Construction
- Built: 1978

Tenants
- BC Mureș, Muresul Târgu Mureș

Sala Sporturilor Târgu Mureș is an indoor arena in Târgu Mureș, Romania. Its best known tenant is the basketball club BC Mureș.
