= Cupa României (women's basketball) =

Romanian Basketball Cup
- Sport: Basketball
- Founded: 1965
- Country: Romania
- Continent: (European Union) Europe
- Most recent champion: Rapid Bucharest (3rd title)
- Most titles: CSM Târgoviște (10 titles)
- Related competitions: Liga Națională

The Cupa României is the main knockout competition for Romanian women's basketball teams. It was established in 1965, though it was cancelled in 1970 to 1975, 1978, 1979, 1982 to 1987, 1989 to 1994 and 1996 to 2003. CSM Târgoviște is the most successful club in the competition with ten titles since 2002.

== Titles ==
Club	Titles	Years winners
CSM Târgoviște	10	2002, 2003, 2004, 2005, 2007, 2009, 2010, 2012, 2013, 2017
Sepsi SIC	9	2008, 2015, 2016, 2018, 2019, 2021, 2022, 2023, 2025
Politehnica București	3	1968, 1977, 1980
Rapid Bucharest	3	1969, 1995, 2026
Progresul București	2	1966, 1967
ICIM Arad	2	2011, 2014
Voința București	2	1981, 1988
CSM CSU Constanța	1	2024
Sportul Studențesc	1	1976
București XI	1	1965

== See also ==
- Romanian Men's Basketball Cup
