= BC ICIM Arad =

FCC Baschet UAV Arad
- Nickname: Galben-Albastrele (The Yellow and Blues); Arădencele (Women from Arad)
- Leagues: Liga Națională
- Founded: 1986; 40 years ago
- History: Constructorul Arad (1986–1992); Constar U Arad (1992–1993); BC Arad (1993–1995); BC ICIM Arad (1995–2010); BC Univ. Goldiș ICIM Arad (2010–present)
- Arena: Victoria
- Capacity: 1,500
- Location: Arad, Romania
- Team colors: Yellow, Blue
- Chairman: Marcel Urban
- Head coach: Sladjan Ivic
- Championships: 9 Romanian Leagues; 2 Romanian Cups
- Website: Official Website
Home	Away

BC ICIM Arad is a professional women's basketball team from Arad, Romania. The club, for sponsorship reasons under the name BC Univ. Goldiș ICIM Arad, competes in the Liga Națională.

The club is one of the most successful basketball clubs in Romanian women's basketball with 9 National Leagues and 2 Romanian Cups.

== Honours ==
Liga Națională

Winners (9): 1993–94, 1997–98, 1998–99, 1999–00, 2000–01, 2005–06, 2007–08, 2010–11, 2012–13
Runners-up (3): 2006–07, 2009–10, 2013–14

Cupa României

Winners (2): 2010–11, 2013–14
Runners-up (2): 2006–07, 2019-2020

Liga I

Winners (1): 1986–87

Central Europe Women's League

Winners (3): 2010–11, 2012–13 2014–15
Runners-up (2): 2011–12, 2013–14

== Current roster ==
Note: Flags indicate national team eligibility at FIBA-sanctioned events. Players may hold other non-FIBA nationalities not displayed.

FCC Baschet Arad roster
Players
Coaches

Pos.	No.	Nat.	Name	Ht.
G	4	(United Kingdom)	Panait, Mihaela	1.69 m (5 ft 7 in)
G	5	(Serbia)	Jovancevic, Tamara
SF	6	(Romania)	Negru, Daria
G	7	(Romania)	Podar, Alina	1.75 m (5 ft 9 in)
SF	8	(Montenegro)	Zivkovic, Dragana	1.82 m (6 ft 0 in)
SF	9	(Romania)	Mititelu, Andreea
C	10	(Philippines)	Animam, Jack	1.93 m (6 ft 4 in)
SF	11	(Romania)	Valea, Blanca
C	12	(Romania)	Ciotir, Anamaria
SF	13	(Romania)	Dobă, Alexia	1.80 m (5 ft 11 in)
C	14	(Slovakia)	Svetlikova, Sona	1.89 m (6 ft 2 in)
SF	15	(Romania)	Fota, Bianca (C)	1.80 m (5 ft 11 in)
G	24	(United States)	Dickey, Sara	1.75 m (5 ft 9 in)
G		(Romania)	Cucu, Paloma

Head coach

- (Serbia) Sladjan Ivic

Assistant coach(es)

- (Romania) Dan Moraru

Legend

- (C) Team captain
- Injured

- Roster
Updated: June 2025
