= CSM Târgoviște (basketball) =

Romanian women's basketball team

- Nickname: Portocala Mecanică (Clockwork Orange)
- Leagues: Liga Națională
- Founded: 1991; 34 years ago
- History: Oțelinox Târgoviște; Livas Metaco Târgoviște; Oțelul Livas Târgoviște; Livas Târgoviște (1991–2003); Livas Petrom Târgoviște (2003–2005); Biandra Târgoviște (2005–2007); MCM Târgoviște (2007–2011); CSM Târgoviște (2011–present)
- Arena: Polyvalent Hall
- Capacity: 2,000
- Location: Târgoviște, Romania
- Team colors: Orange, Blue
- President: Cristian Florian Savu
- Head coach: Cătălin Tănase
- Championships: 12 Romanian Leagues; 9 Romanian Cups
- Website: Official website
Home	Away

Club Sportiv Municipal Târgoviște, commonly referred to as simply CSM Târgoviște, is a Romanian women's basketball club from Târgoviște. Founded in 1991, it plays in the Liga Națională.

== History ==
The club promoted to the first league in 1992. Târgoviște won its first national championship in 1995 and since then the team has won nine more championships. In 2010 it reached the Eurocup's Quarter-finals after beating MBK Ružomberok and CB Islas Canarias in the knockout stages, ending the competition after losing dramatically to Dynamo Kursk (75-57 and 55-76).

The club has gone through several name changes during its existence, including Oțelinox, Livas Metaco, Oțelul Livas, Livas, Livas Petrom, Biandra, Municipal, MCM Târgoviște, BC Municipal MCM and currently CSM Târgoviște.

== Honours ==
Liga Națională

Winners (12): 1994–95, 1995–96, 2001–02, 2002–03, 2003–04, 2004–05, 2006–07, 2008–09, 2009–10, 2011–12, 2013–14, 2014–15
Runners-up (3): 2005–06, 2012–13, 2015–16

Cupa României

Winners (9): 2002–03, 2003–04, 2004–05, 2006–07, 2008–09, 2009–10, 2011–12, 2012–13, 2016–17

Liga I

Winners (1): 1991–92

== Notable players ==
Criteria

To appear in this section a player must have either:

- Played at least three seasons for the club.
- Set a club record or won an individual award while at the club.
- Played at least one official international match for their national team at any time.
- Played at least one official WNBA match at any time.

- (Romania) Annemarie Părău
- (United States) Britney Jones
- (United States) Natalie Novosel
- (United States) Monique Currie
- (United States) Tina Thompson
- (United States) Nicky Anosike
- (Israel) Shay Doron
- (Germany) Linda Fröhlich
- (Latvia) Elīna Babkina
- (Latvia) Elīna Dikaioulaku
- (Montenegro) Milka Bjelica
