= Liga Națională (women's basketball) =

- Founded: 1950; 76 years ago
- First season: 1950–51
- Country: Romania
- Confederation: Romanian Basketball Federation
- Divisions: 2
- Number of teams: 8
- Level on pyramid: 1
- Domestic cup: Cupa României
- International cup(s): EuroLeague; EuroCup; FIBA Europe SuperCup
- Current champions: Rapid București (10th title) (2025–26)
- Most championships: Universitatea Cluj-Napoca (14 titles)
- CEO: Horia Păun
- Website: www.frbaschet.ro
- 2025–26 Liga Națională

The Liga Națională, formerly known as Divizia A, is the women's top-tier professional basketball league of Romania. Established in 1950, it is currently contested by eight teams. Universitatea Cluj-Napoca is the Liga Națională's most successful club with fourteen titles including a ten-years winning streak between 1984 and 1994, while CSM Târgoviște and ICIM Arad have dominated the championship in subsequent years with ten and eight titles respectively.

In 2013 the Romanian champion took part in the FIBA Euroleague for the first time since the competition's refoundation in 1997.

== Titles ==
| Club | Titles | Years winners |
|---|---|---|
| Universitatea Cluj-Napoca | 14 | 1953, 1954, 1981, 1982, 1984, 1985, 1986, 1987, 1988, 1989, 1990, 1991, 1992, 1993 |
| CSM Târgoviște | 12 | 1995, 1996, 2002, 2003, 2004, 2005, 2007, 2009, 2010, 2012, 2014, 2015 |
| Rapid București | 10 | 1951, 1952, 1960, 1961, 1962, 1965, 1969, 1972, 1978, 2026 |
| ICIM Arad | 9 | 1994, 1998, 1999, 2000, 2001, 2006, 2008, 2011, 2013 |
| Politehnica București | 8 | 1966, 1967, 1968, 1970, 1971, 1973, 1974, 1980 |
| Sepsi SIC | 8 | 2016, 2017, 2018, 2019, 2021, 2022, 2023, 2025 |
| Știinta București | 4 | 1950, 1955, 1963, 1964 |
| Constructorul București | 4 | 1956, 1957, 1958, 1959 |
| Sportul Studențesc | 3 | 1975, 1976, 1977 |
| Universitatea Oradea | 1 | 1979 |
| Voința București | 1 | 1983 |
| ACRO București | 1 | 1997 |
| CSM CSU Constanța | 1 | 2024 |

== See also ==
- Cupa României (women's basketball)
- Romanian Men's Basketball League
