= Timeline of Treviso =

The following is a timeline of the history of the city of Treviso in the Veneto region of Italy.

== Prior to 14th century ==
- 46 BCE – Tarvisium becomes a Roman municipium (approximate date).
- 1st C. CE – Via Claudia Augusta (road) built in vicinity of town.
- 6th C. CE – seat of a Lombard duke.
- 550 – Roman Catholic Diocese of Treviso established (approximate date).
- 773 CE – Mint established (approximate date).
- 776 – "Charlemagne entered Treviso."
- 899 – Treviso sacked by Magyar forces.
- 952 – Treviso becomes part of the Holy Roman Empire.
- 1000 – Treviso Cathedral construction begins (approximate date).
- 1050 – Chiesa di San Giovanni Battista (Treviso) (church) built (approximate date).
- 1117 – Earthquake.
- 1135 – Biblioteca capitolare di Treviso (cathedral library) cataloged.
- 1141 – Treviso Cathedral remodelled in Romanesque style.
- 1153 – Mestre-Treviso Terraglio (road) mentioned.
- 1176 – Podestà of Treviso office established.
- 1183 – Peace of Constance - independence from the Lombard league.
- 1217 – Palazzo dei Trecento built.
- 1218 – Torre Civica di Treviso (tower) built.
- 1219 – Walls of Treviso expanded.
- 1226 – Convento di San Francesco (Treviso) (monastery) established (approximate date).
- 1263 – University established.
- 1267 – Loggia dei Cavalieri built.
- 1269 – Palazzo del Commune built on the Piazza dei Signori.
- 1270 – Chiesa di San Francesco (Treviso) (church) built.

== 14th–19th centuries ==
- 1312 – "A brief republic was proclaimed in Treviso" (until 1318).
- 1329 – Cangrande I della Scala in power.
- 1339 – March of Treviso becomes part of the Venetian Republic.
- 1346 – Chiesa di Santa Caterina (Treviso) (church) construction begins.
- 1368 – Chiesa di San Nicolò (Treviso) (church) built.
- 1389 – Santa Lucia Church built.^{(it)}
- 1471 – Printing press in operation.
- 1473 – Chiesa di Santa Maria Maggiore (Treviso) (church) built.
- 1490 – Palazzo Pretorio built on the Piazza dei Signori (approximate date).
- 1511 – Siege of Treviso during the War of the League of Cambrai.
- 1513 – City walls fortified.
- 1516 – Porta Santi Quaranta (gate) built.
- 1518 – Porta San Tomaso (gate) built.
- 1692 – Teatro Onigo (theatre) opens
- 1758 – Chiesa di Sant'Agostino (Treviso) (church) consecrated.
- 1768 – Treviso Cathedral demolished and rebuilt in Neoclassical style,
- 1769 – Biblioteca comunale di Treviso (library) founded.
- 1797 – Treviso taken by French forces under Édouard Mortier, Duke of Trévise.
- 1801 – Armistice of Treviso between France and Austria.
- 1813 – Austrians in power.
- 1836 – Treviso Cathedral facade remodelled.
- 1848
  - 19 March: Austrians ousted.
  - 14 June: Austrian rule restored.
- 1851 – Treviso Centrale railway station opens; Mestre-Treviso railway begins operating.
- 1866 – Treviso becomes part of the Kingdom of Italy.
- 1869 – Teatro Mario Del Monaco (theatre) built.
- 1875 – Independence Monument erected.
- 1877 – Vicenza-Treviso Railway begins operating.
- 1885 – Motta di Livenza-Treviso railway begins operating.
- 1886 – Ferrovia Belluno-Feltre-Treviso (railway) in operation.
- 1897 – Population: 36,120.

== 20th century ==
- 1909 – Foot Ball Club Treviso formed.
- 1910 – Treviso tramway begins operating.
- 1911
  - Teatro Eden (theatre) opens.
  - Population: 41,022.
- 1917 – Treviso sacked by Austrian forces in World War I.
- 1918 – Campo trincerato di Treviso (defensive trench) built.
- 1932 – Associazione Sportiva Rugby Treviso formed.
- 1933 – Stadio Omobono Tenni (stadium) opens.
- 1935 – Treviso Airport in use.
- 1944 – Bombing of Treviso in World War II.
- 1953 – Treviso Centrale railway station rebuilt.
- 1973 – Stadio Comunale di Monigo (stadium) opens.
- 1975 – Antonio Mazzarolli becomes mayor.
- 1978 – La Tribuna di Treviso newspaper begins publication.

== 21st century ==
- 2013
  - A.C.D. Treviso 2013 (football club) formed.
  - Local election held; Giovanni Manildo becomes mayor.
  - Population: 82,462.
- 2018: local election held; Mario Conte becomes mayor.

== See also ==
- History of Treviso
- List of mayors of Treviso, 1866–present
- List of podestà of Treviso, 1176–1866
- List of bishops of Treviso
- Urban development of Treviso
- Timeline of the Republic of Venice, of which Treviso was part 1339-1797
- Veneto history (it) (region)

Timelines of other cities in the macroregion of Northeast Italy:^{(it)}

- Emilia-Romagna region: Timeline of Bologna; Ferrara; Forlì; Modena; Parma; Piacenza; Ravenna; Reggio Emilia; Rimini
- Friuli-Venezia Giulia region: Timeline of Trieste
- Trentino-South Tyrol region: Timeline of Trento
- Veneto region: Timeline of Padua; Venice; Verona; Vicenza

== Bibliography ==
=== In English ===
- William Smith, ed. (1872) [1854]. "Tarvisium". Dictionary of Greek and Roman Geography. London: John Murray. hdl:2027/hvd.ah5cur.
- "Treviso", Hand-book for Travellers in Northern Italy (16th ed.), London: John Murray, 1897, OCLC 2231483
- "Treviso" . Encyclopædia Britannica. Vol. 27 (11th ed.). 1910. p. 256.
- "Treviso", Northern Italy (14th ed.), Leipzig: Karl Baedeker, 1913
- Roy Domenico (2002). "Veneto: Treviso". Regions of Italy: a Reference Guide to History and Culture. Greenwood. pp. 387+. ISBN 0313307334.
- Christopher Kleinhenz, ed. (2004). "Treviso". Medieval Italy: an Encyclopedia. Routledge. ISBN 0415939291.

=== In Italian ===
- Nicola Bernardini, ed. (1890). "Provincia di Treviso". Guida della stampa periodica italiana [Guide to Italian Periodicals] (in Italian). Lecce: R. Tipografia editrice salentina dei fratelli Spacciante. p. 708+.
- "Treviso", Enciclopedia Italiana (in Italian), 1937
