= 2021–22 EuroCup Women =

EuroCup Women
- Season: 2021–22
- Teams: Competition proper: 48; Total: 61

Finals
- Champions: (France) Tango Bourges Basket
- Runners-up: (Italy) Umana Reyer Venezia
- Semifinalists: (Turkey) Galatasaray (Turkey) CBK Mersin Yenisehir Bld

The 2021–22 EuroCup Women was the twentieth edition of FIBA Europe's second-tier international competition for women's basketball clubs under such name.

== Teams ==
Regular season
Conference 1		Conference 2	
(Romania) ACS Sepsi SIC (EL Q)	(Poland) AZS AJP Gorzów Wielkopolski (3rd)	(France) Tango Bourges Basket (EL Q)	(France) Roche Vendée BC (6th)
(Turkey) Kayseri Basketbol (EL Q)	(Russia) NIKA Syktyvkar (4th)	(Spain) Valencia Basket (EL Q)	(Germany) Rutronik Stars Keltern (1st)
(Belarus) Horizont Minsk (1st)	(Russia) Nadezhda Orenburg (5th)	(Belgium) BC Namur-Capitale (1st)	(Italy) Virtus Segafredo Bologna (4th)
(Greece) Panathinaikos (1st)	(Russia) WBC Enisey Krasnoyarsk (7th)	(Belgium) Royal Castors Braine (2nd)	(Slovakia) MBK Ružomberok (1st)
(Greece) Olympiacos (2nd)	(Serbia) Crvena zvezda (1st)	(Belgium) Kangoeroes Basket Mechelen (5th)	(Spain) Lointek Gernika Bizkaia (4th)
(Hungary) Uni Győr MÉLY-ÚT (3rd)	(Turkey) Nesibe Aydın (3rd)	(Czech Republic) BK Žabiny Brno (3rd)	(Spain) Estudiantes Madrid (5th)
(Hungary) Aluinvent DVTK Miskolc (4th)	(Turkey) Ormanspor (5th)	(Czech Republic) KP Brno (4th)	(Spain) Ciudad de La Laguna (6th)
(Israel) Neve David Ramla (3rd)	(Turkey) Çukurova Basketbol (6th)	(France) LDLC ASVEL Féminin (4th)	(Switzerland) BCF Elfic Fribourg (1st)
(Poland) MKS Polkowice (2nd)	(Ukraine) BC Prometey (1st)	(France) ESB Villeneuve-d'Ascq (5th)	
Qualification round
Conference 1		Conference 2	
(Greece) PAOK (5th)	(Poland) Basket 25 Bydgoszcz (4th)	(Belgium) VOO Liege Basket (4th)	(Italy) ASD Dinamo LAB Sassari (12th)
(Greece) Eleftheria Moschatou (9th)	(Poland) AZS UMCS Lublin (5th)	(Belgium) Kortrijk Spurs (6th)	(Luxembourg) BBC Gréngewald Hueschtert (5th)
(Greece) Niki Lefkadas (10th)	(Russia) Sparta & K Vidnoye (8th)	(France) Flammes Carolo Basket (7th)	(Norway) Ulriken Eagles (1st)
(Hungary) Ludovika-FCSM Csata (5th)	(Sweden) A3 Basket Umeå (3rd)	(France) Tarbes Gespe Bigorre (8th)	(Portugal) Clube União Sportiva (2nd)
(Hungary) PEAC-Pécs (6th)	(Turkey) Hatayspor (8th)	(United Kingdom) London Lions (1st)	(Slovakia) Piešťanské Čajky (2nd)
(Israel) Elitzur Holon (4th)	(Turkey) Elazığ İl Özel İdarespor (11th)	(Iceland) Haukar (2nd)	(Spain) Ensino Lugo (7th)
		(Italy) Magnolia Basket Campobasso (9th)	(Spain) CB Islas Canarias (8th)

== Schedule ==
Phase	Round	Dates
Draw		19 August 2021
Qualifying round	Gameday 1	23 September 2021
Qualifying round	Gameday 2	30 September 2021
Regular season	Gameday 1	14 October 2021
Regular season	Gameday 2	21 October 2021
Regular season	Gameday 3	28 October 2021
Regular season	Gameday 4	3 November 2021
Regular season	Gameday 5	25 November 2021
Regular season	Gameday 6	2 December 2021
Play-Off Round 1	Gameday 1	15 December 2021
Play-Off Round 1	Gameday 2	22 December 2021
Round of 16	Gameday 1	13 January 2022
Round of 16	Gameday 2	20 January 2022
Round of 8	Gameday 1	27 January 2022
Round of 8	Gameday 2	2 February 2022
Quarter-Finals	Gameday 1	10–15 March 2022
Quarter-Finals	Gameday 2	17–18 March 2022
Final Four	Semifinals	5 April 2022
Final Four	Final	7 April 2022

== Draw ==
The draw will take place in Freising, Germany at 11:00 CET of August 19, 2021.

Draw rules are as follows.

Divided into two geographical conferences, a total of 61 clubs participate.

26 teams enter the competition in the Qualifiers stage and four teams move down from the EuroLeague Women Qualifiers.

The seedings are based on the ranking of the club performances in the European Club Competitions in the last three seasons.

== Qualification round ==
=== Conference 1 ===
Team 1	Agg.	Team 2	1st leg	2nd leg
Elitzur Holon (Israel)	111–166	(Turkey) Hatayspor	59–76	52–90
Eleftheria Moschatou (Greece)	109–131	(Poland) KS Basket 25 Bydgoszcz	48–57	61–74
AZS UMCS Lublin (Poland)	135–130	(Russia) Sparta&K Moscow Region Vidnoje	62–61	73–69
PAOK (Greece)	134–142	(Turkey) Birevim Elazığ İl Özel İdare	58–62 (Note: The game was played in Elâzığ instead of Thessaloniki by agreement between both teams.)	76–80
Niki Lefkadas (Greece)	127–152	(Hungary) NKA Universitas PEAC	63–80	64–72
Ludovika-FCSM Csata Budapest (Hungary)	158–141	(Sweden) A3 Basket Umeå	77–62	81–79

=== Conference 2 ===
Team 1	Agg.	Team 2	1st leg	2nd leg
Haukar (Iceland)	160–157	(Portugal) Clube União Sportiva	81–76	79–81
Magnolia Basket Campobasso (Italy)	120–130	(Spain) Duran Maquinaria Ensino Lugo	65–64	55–66
Ulriken Eagles (Norway)	112–169	(Belgium) VOO Liege Basket	57–98	55–71
Piešťanské Čajky (Slovakia)	116–152	(France) Flammes Carolo Basket	62–74	54–78
Kortrijk Spurs (Belgium)	80–184	(France) Tarbes Gespe Bigorre	41–96	39–88
Dinamo LAB ASD (Italy)	146–128	(Luxembourg) BBC Gréngewald Hueschtert	85–67	61–61
London Lions (United Kingdom)	132–113	(Spain) CB Islas Canarias	76–46	56–67

== Regular season ==
=== Conference 1 ===
==== Group A ====
Pos	Team	Pld	W	L	PF	PA	PD	Pts	Qualification	POL	ENI	HAT	PAN
1	(Poland) MKS Polkowice	6	5	1	482	418	+64	11	Play-off Round 1	—	94–80	83–72	76–60
2	(Russia) WBC Enisey Krasnoyarsk	6	3	3	446	455	−9	9	Play-off Round 1	70–68	—	63–53	61–69
3	(Turkey) Hatayspor	6	2	4	457	457	0	8	Play-off Round 1	72–94	100–76	—	87–56
4	(Greece) Panathinaikos AC	6	2	4	405	460	−55	8		64–67	71–96	85–73	—

Source: FIBA.com
Rules for classification: 1) Points; 2) Head-to-head record; 3) Head-to-head point differential. 4) General point differential 5) Points scored

==== Group B ====
Pos	Team	Pld	W	L	PF	PA	PD	Pts	Qualification	PRO	SEP	UGR	ELA
1	(Ukraine) BC Prometey	6	5	1	545	413	+132	11	Play-off Round 1	—	86–64	94–68	92–52
2	(Romania) ACS Sepsi SIC	6	4	2	416	414	+2	10	Play-off Round 1	80–78	—	70–65	62–47
3	(Hungary) Uni Győr	6	2	4	433	489	−56	8		83–117	73–69	—	77–65
4	(Turkey) Birevim Elazığ İl Özel İdare	6	1	5	369	447	−78	7		66–78	65–71	74–67	—

Source: FIBA.com
Rules for classification: 1) Points; 2) Head-to-head record; 3) Head-to-head point differential. 4) General point differential 5) Points scored

==== Group C ====
Pos	Team	Pld	W	L	PF	PA	PD	Pts	Qualification	MER	LUB	HOR	GOR
1	(Turkey) CBK Mersin Yenisehir Bld	6	6	0	507	368	+139	12	Play-off Round 1	—	98–75	78–48	106–62
2	(Poland) AZS UMCS Lublin	6	3	3	413	407	+6	9	Play-off Round 1	60–72	—	50–62	79–59
3	(Belarus) BC Horizont Minsk Region	6	2	4	360	429	−69	8		55–78	61–70	—	76–73
4	(Poland) KS AZS AJP Gorzów	6	1	5	397	473	−76	7		68–75	55–79	80–58	—

Source: FIBA.com
Rules for classification: 1) Points; 2) Head-to-head record; 3) Head-to-head point differential. 4) General point differential 5) Points scored

==== Group D ====
Pos	Team	Pld	W	L	PF	PA	PD	Pts	Qualification	NAY	RAM	PEC	KAY
1	(Turkey) Nesibe Aydın	6	5	1	496	397	+99	11	Play-off Round 1	—	86–60	96–62	84–57
2	(Israel) Neve David Ramla	6	3	3	448	444	+4	9	Play-off Round 1	64–79	—	66–56	89–71
3	(Hungary) NKA Universitas PEAC	6	3	3	429	456	−27	9	Play-off Round 1	78–66	90–83	—	80–74
4	(Turkey) Bellona Kayseri	6	1	5	411	487	−76	7		76–85	62–86	71–63	—

Source: FIBA.com
Rules for classification: 1) Points; 2) Head-to-head record; 3) Head-to-head point differential. 4) General point differential 5) Points scored

==== Group E ====
Pos	Team	Pld	W	L	PF	PA	PD	Pts	Qualification	NAD	OLY	CZV	BYD
1	(Russia) BC Nadezhda Orenburg	6	5	1	494	393	+101	11	Play-off Round 1	—	88–70	83–72	77–45
2	(Greece) Olympiacos SFP	6	5	1	504	437	+67	11	Play-off Round 1	84–81	—	82–66	103–68
3	(Serbia) Crvena Zvezda	6	2	4	447	477	−30	8	Play-off Round 1	86–92	70–78	—	73–69
4	(Poland) KS Basket 25 Bydgoszcz	6	0	6	355	493	−138	6		36–73	64–87	73–80	—

Source: FIBA.com
Rules for classification: 1) Points; 2) Head-to-head record; 3) Head-to-head point differential. 4) General point differential 5) Points scored

==== Group F ====
Pos	Team	Pld	W	L	PF	PA	PD	Pts	Qualification	MIS	ORM	NIK	CSA
1	(Hungary) Aluinvent DVTK Miskolc	6	4	2	424	394	+30	10	Play-off Round 1	—	82–72	65–58	69–49
2	(Turkey) Orman Gençlik	6	4	2	469	436	+33	10	Play-off Round 1	81–73	—	84–89	70–52
3	(Russia) Nika Syktyvkar	6	3	3	462	422	+40	9	Play-off Round 1	82–68	74–76	—	82–47
4	(Hungary) Ludovika-FCSM Csata Budapest	6	1	5	348	451	−103	7		52–67	66–86	82–77	—

Source: FIBA.com
Rules for classification: 1) Points; 2) Head-to-head record; 3) Head-to-head point differential. 4) General point differential 5) Points scored

=== Conference 2 ===
==== Group G ====
Pos	Team	Pld	W	L	PF	PA	PD	Pts	Qualification	BOU	FRI	TEN	DIN
1	(France) Tango Bourges Basket	6	6	0	595	371	+224	12	Play-off Round 1	—	102–49	91–56	118–67
2	(Switzerland) BCF Elfic Fribourg	6	3	3	438	490	−52	9	Play-off Round 1	59–82	—	82–78	100–81
3	(Spain) Ciudad de La Laguna Tenerife	6	2	4	449	447	+2	8	Play-off Round 1	79–80	66–74	—	88–56
4	(Italy) Dinamo LAB ASD	6	1	5	410	584	−174	7		61–122	81–74	64–82	—

Source: FIBA.com
Rules for classification: 1) Points; 2) Head-to-head record; 3) Head-to-head point differential. 4) General point differential 5) Points scored

==== Group H ====
Pos	Team	Pld	W	L	PF	PA	PD	Pts	Qualification	VEN	CAR	GER	VIR
1	(France) Roche Vendée BC	6	5	1	446	402	+44	11	Play-off Round 1	—	68–64	75–58	63–67
2	(France) Flammes Carolo Basket	6	3	3	413	371	+42	9	Play-off Round 1	69–72	—	58–69	84–46
3	(Spain) Lointek Gernika Bizkaia	6	2	4	388	408	−20	8	Play-off Round 1	78–90	56–58	—	62–67
4	(Italy) Virtus Segafredo Bologna	6	2	4	366	432	−66	8		66–78	60–80	60–65	—

Source: FIBA.com
Rules for classification: 1) Points; 2) Head-to-head record; 3) Head-to-head point differential. 4) General point differential 5) Points scored

==== Group I ====
Pos	Team	Pld	W	L	PF	PA	PD	Pts	Qualification	VAL	KAN	ENS	NAM
1	(Spain) Valencia Basket	6	6	0	451	275	+176	12	Play-off Round 1	—	67–42	60–53	95–45
2	(Belgium) Kangoeroes Basket Mechelen	6	3	3	368	369	−1	9	Play-off Round 1	59–67	—	64–57	66–70
3	(Spain) Duran Maquinaria Ensino Lugo	6	2	4	330	369	−39	8		46–66	50–69	—	67–62
4	(Belgium) Basket Namur Capitale	6	1	5	313	449	−136	7		30–96	58–68	48–57	—

Source: FIBA.com
Rules for classification: 1) Points; 2) Head-to-head record; 3) Head-to-head point differential. 4) General point differential 5) Points scored

==== Group J ====
Pos	Team	Pld	W	L	PF	PA	PD	Pts	Qualification	ASV	EST	RUŽ	LIE
1	(France) LDLC ASVEL Féminin	6	5	1	489	303	+186	11	Play-off Round 1	—	72–51	81–50	89–31
2	(Spain) Estudiantes Madrid	6	4	2	416	354	+62	10	Play-off Round 1	70–67	—	51–55	93–52
3	(Slovakia) MBK Ružomberok	6	3	3	370	418	−48	9	Play-off Round 1	60–77	53–85	—	72–69
4	(Belgium) VOO Liege Basket	6	0	6	303	503	−200	6		41–103	55–66	55–80	—

Source: FIBA.com
Rules for classification: 1) Points; 2) Head-to-head record; 3) Head-to-head point differential. 4) General point differential 5) Points scored

==== Group K ====
Pos	Team	Pld	W	L	PF	PA	PD	Pts	Qualification	CBR	ŽBR	LON	KEL
1	(Belgium) Mithra Castors Braine	6	5	1	436	386	+50	11	Play-off Round 1	—	81–65	70–67	61–59
2	(Czech Republic) BK Žabiny Brno	6	4	2	441	408	+33	10	Play-off Round 1	58–75	—	68–41	90–60
3	(United Kingdom) London Lions	6	2	4	393	429	−36	8	Play-off Round 1	69–63	74–82	—	61–68
4	(Germany) Rutronik Stars Keltern	6	1	5	410	457	−47	7		68–86	77–78	78–81	—

Source: FIBA.com
Rules for classification: 1) Points; 2) Head-to-head record; 3) Head-to-head point differential. 4) General point differential 5) Points scored

==== Group L ====
Pos	Team	Pld	W	L	PF	PA	PD	Pts	Qualification	VIL	TAR	BRN	HAU
1	(France) Villeneuve D'Ascq ESB	6	5	1	474	290	+184	11	Play-off Round 1	—	86–51	82–42	82–33
2	(France) Tarbes Gespe Bigorre	6	5	1	402	354	+48	11	Play-off Round 1	78–69	—	73–56	66–53
3	(Czech Republic) KP Brno	6	2	4	332	395	−63	8		45–71	49–55	—	60–53
4	(Iceland) Haukar	6	0	6	282	451	−169	6		41–84	41–79	61–80	—

Source: FIBA.com
Rules for classification: 1) Points; 2) Head-to-head record; 3) Head-to-head point differential. 4) General point differential 5) Points scored

=== Ranking of third-placed teams ===
==== Conference 1 ====
Pos	Grp	Team	Pld	W	L	PF	PA	PD	Pts	Qualification
1	F	(Russia) Nika Syktyvkar	6	3	3	462	422	+40	9	Play-off Round 1
2	D	(Hungary) NKA Universitas PEAC	6	3	3	429	456	−27	9	Play-off Round 1
3	A	(Turkey) Hatayspor	6	2	4	457	457	0	8	Play-off Round 1
4	E	(Serbia) Crvena Zvezda	6	2	4	447	477	−30	8	Play-off Round 1
5	B	(Hungary) Uni Győr	6	2	4	433	489	−56	8	
6	C	(Belarus) BC Horizont Minsk Region	6	2	4	360	429	−69	8	

Source: FIBA.com
Rules for classification: 1) Points; 2) Points difference; 3) Points scored.

==== Conference 2 ====
Pos	Grp	Team	Pld	W	L	PF	PA	PD	Pts	Qualification
1	J	(Slovakia) MBK Ružomberok	6	3	3	370	418	−48	9	Play-off Round 1
2	G	(Spain) Ciudad de La Laguna Tenerife	6	2	4	449	447	+2	8	Play-off Round 1
3	H	(Spain) Lointek Gernika Bizkaia	6	2	4	388	408	−20	8	Play-off Round 1
4	K	(United Kingdom) London Lions	6	2	4	393	429	−36	8	Play-off Round 1
5	I	(Spain) Duran Maquinaria Ensino Lugo	6	2	4	330	369	−39	8	
6	L	(Czech Republic) KP Brno	6	2	4	332	395	−63	8	

Source: FIBA.com
Rules for classification: 1) Points; 2) Points difference; 3) Points scored.

=== Seeding ===
Seed	Grp	Team	Pld	W	L	PF	PA	PD	Pts
1	G	(France) Tango Bourges Basket	6	6	0	595	371	+224	12
2	I	(Spain) Valencia Basket	6	6	0	451	275	+176	12
3	C	(Turkey) CBK Mersin Yenisehir Bld	6	6	0	507	368	+139	12
4	J	(France) LDLC ASVEL Féminin	6	5	1	489	303	+186	11
5	L	(France) Villeneuve D'Ascq ESB	6	5	1	474	290	+184	11
6	B	(Ukraine) BC Prometey	6	5	1	545	413	+132	11
7	E	(Russia) BC Nadezhda Orenburg	6	5	1	494	393	+101	11
8	D	(Turkey) Nesibe Aydın	6	5	1	496	397	+99	11
9	E	(Greece) Olympiacos SFP	6	5	1	504	437	+67	11
10	A	(Poland) MKS Polkowice	6	5	1	482	418	+64	11
11	K	(Belgium) Mithra Castors Braine	6	5	1	436	386	+50	11
12	L	(France) Tarbes Gespe Bigorre	6	5	1	402	354	+48	11
13	H	(France) Roche Vendée BC	6	5	1	446	402	+44	11
14	J	(Spain) Estudiantes Madrid	6	4	2	416	354	+62	10
15	F	(Turkey) Orman Gençlik	6	4	2	469	436	+33	10
16	K	(Czech Republic) BK Žabiny Brno	6	4	2	441	408	+33	10
17	F	(Hungary) Aluinvent DVTK Miskolc	6	4	2	424	394	+30	10
18	B	(Romania) ACS Sepsi SIC	6	4	2	416	414	+2	10
19	H	(France) Flammes Carolo Basket	6	3	3	413	371	+42	9
20	F	(Russia) Nika Syktyvkar	6	3	3	462	422	+40	9
21	C	(Poland) AZS UMCS Lublin	6	3	3	413	407	+6	9
22	D	(Israel) Neve David Ramla	6	3	3	448	444	+4	9
23	I	(Belgium) Kangoeroes Basket Mechelen	6	3	3	368	369	−1	9
24	A	(Russia) WBC Enisey Krasnoyarsk	6	3	3	446	455	−9	9
25	D	(Hungary) NKA Universitas PEAC	6	3	3	429	456	−27	9
26	J	(Slovakia) MBK Ružomberok	6	3	3	370	418	−48	9
27	G	(Switzerland) BCF Elfic Fribourg	6	3	3	438	490	−52	9
28	G	(Spain) Ciudad de La Laguna Tenerife	6	2	4	449	447	+2	8
29	A	(Turkey) Hatayspor	6	2	4	457	457	0	8
30	H	(Spain) Lointek Gernika Bizkaia	6	2	4	388	408	−20	8
31	E	(Serbia) Crvena Zvezda	6	2	4	447	477	−30	8
32	K	(United Kingdom) London Lions	6	2	4	393	429	−36	8

Source: FIBA.com
Rules for classification: 1) Points; 2) Points difference; 3) Points scored.

== Play-off Round 1 ==
Team 1	Agg.	Team 2	1st leg	2nd leg
London Lions (United Kingdom)	130–160	(France) Tango Bourges Basket	65–64	65–96
Crvena zvezda (Serbia)	114–176	(Spain) Valencia Basket	63–80	51–96
Lointek Gernika Bizkaia (Spain)	123–128	(Turkey) CBK Mersin Yenisehir Bld	83–59	40–69
Hatayspor (Turkey)	109–209	(France) LDLC ASVEL Féminin	63–110	46–99
Ciudad de La Laguna Tenerife (Spain)	105–168	(France) ESB Villeneuve-d'Ascq	56–93	49–75
BCF Elfic Fribourg (Switzerland)	136–181	(Ukraine) BC Prometey	82–96	54–85
MBK Ružomberok (Slovakia)	137–166	(Russia) Nadezhda Orenburg	86–86	51–80
NKA Universitas PEAC (Hungary)	139–145	(Turkey) Nesibe Aydın	68–71	71–74 (OT)
WBC Enisey Krasnoyarsk (Russia)	139–169	(Greece) Olympiacos	70–85	69–84
Kangoeroes Basket Mechelen (Belgium)	136–143	(Poland) MKS Polkowice	83–70	53–73 (OT)
Neve David Ramla (Israel)	154–172	(Belgium) Royal Castors Braine	75–86	79–86
AZS UMCS Lublin (Poland)	135–110	(France) Tarbes Gespe Bigorre	72–55	63–55
NIKA Syktyvkar (Russia)	211–172	(France) Roche Vendée BC	103–74	108–98
Flammes Carolo Basket (France)	135–132	(Spain) Estudiantes Madrid	75–78	60–54
ACS Sepsi SIC (Romania)	121–152	(Turkey) Orman Gençlik	52–80	69–72
Aluinvent DVTK Miskolc (Hungary)	126–137	(Czech Republic) BK Žabiny Brno	57–61	69–76

== Round of 16 ==
Team 1	Agg.	Team 2	1st leg	2nd leg
BK Žabiny Brno (Czech Republic)	104–173	(France) Tango Bourges Basket	49–79	55–94
Orman Gençlik (Turkey)	141–152	(Spain) Valencia Basket	68–66	73–86
Flammes Carolo Basket (France)	112–174	(Turkey) CBK Mersin Yenisehir Bld	64–95 (Note: The game was played in Mersin instead of Charleville-Mézières by agreement between both teams.)	48–79
NIKA Syktyvkar (Russia)	63–96	(France) LDLC ASVEL Féminin	63–76	0–20
AZS UMCS Lublin (Poland)	158–142	(France) ESB Villeneuve-d'Ascq	73–83 (Note: The game was played in Villeneuve-d'Ascq instead of Lublin by agreement between both teams.)	85–59
Royal Castors Braine (Belgium)	148–172	(Ukraine) BC Prometey	92–93	56–79
MKS Polkowice (Poland)	162–140	(Russia) Nadezhda Orenburg	75–72	87–68
Olympiacos (Greece)	166–151	(Turkey) Nesibe Aydın	79–83	87–68

== Round of 8 ==
Team 1	Agg.	Team 2	1st leg	2nd leg
Olympiacos (Greece)	119–149	(France) Tango Bourges Basket	60–73	59–76
MKS Polkowice (Poland)	143–148	(Spain) Valencia Basket	77–85	66–63
BC Prometey (Ukraine)	133–181	(Turkey) CBK Mersin Yenisehir Bld	67–86 (Note: The game was played in Plovdiv (Bulgaria) instead of Slobozhanske due to the Ukraine-Russia crisis.)	66–95
AZS UMCS Lublin (Poland)	120–144	(France) LDLC ASVEL Féminin	66–66	54–78

== Quarterfinals ==
Team 1	Agg.	Team 2	1st leg	2nd leg
Basket Landes (France)	120–137	(France) Tango Bourges Basket	65–63	55–74
Umana Reyer Venezia (Italy)	132–128	(Spain) Valencia Basket	57–61	75–67
LDLC ASVEL Féminin (France)	132–159	(Turkey) CBK Mersin Yenisehir Bld	64–77	68–82
KSC Szekszárd (Hungary)	129–164	(Turkey) Galatasaray	60–88	69–76

== Final Four ==
=== Semifinals ===
Team 1	Score	Team 2
Umana Reyer Venezia (Italy)	85–80	(Turkey) CBK Mersin Yenisehir Bld
Tango Bourges Basket (France)	69–67	(Turkey) Galatasaray

=== Third place game ===
Team 1	Score	Team 2
Galatasaray (Turkey)	75–67	(Turkey) CBK Mersin Yenisehir Bld

=== Final ===
Team 1	Score	Team 2
Tango Bourges Basket (France)	74–38	(Italy) Umana Reyer Venezia

== See also ==
- 2021–22 EuroLeague Women
