= Virtus Bologna (women's basketball) =

- Nickname: Vu Nere (Black V)
- Leagues: LBF; EuroLeague Women
- Founded: 2019
- Dissolved: 2024
- History: Virtus Pallacanestro Bologna; 2019–2024
- Arena: PalaDozza
- Capacity: 5,570
- Location: Bologna, Italy
- Team colors: White, black
- Main sponsor: Segafredo Zanetti
- President: Massimo Zanetti
- Ownership: Massimo Zanetti
- Championships: 1 Italian Supercup
- Website: virtus.it
Home	Away

Virtus Pallacanestro Bologna, known for sponsorship reasons as Virtus Segafredo Bologna, was an Italian professional women's basketball club based in Bologna, Emilia-Romagna.

The club was founded in 2019, as the women's wing of Virtus Bologna, one of the most important men's basketball team in Europe. Virtus is owned by the coffee entrepreneur Massimo Zanetti.

== History ==
=== 2019–2021: Beginnings ===
In July 2019, the CEO of Virtus Bologna, Luca Baraldi, announced the opening of a women's basketball wing, to participate in the Serie A1 championship. In the same month, Alberto Piombo, a tax advisor, was appointed president of the women's wing. The 2019–20 season started with some troubles for Virtus, however, it was later cancelled due to COVID-19 pandemic.

In the 2020–21, Virtus signed among others Abby Bishop, Brooque Williams and Ana Marjia Begic, while it confirmed many players of the previous season, like the team captain, Elisabetta Tassinari. Moreover, the new head coach was Lorenzo Serventi. Virtus ended the regular season at the fourth place and was defeated in the national semi-finals by Reyer Venezia.

=== 2021–2024: Zandalasini era ===
On 20 May 2021, the club signed the 25 years old Cecilia Zandalasini, widely considered among the best Italian players of all time and 2017 WNBA Champion with the Minnesota Lynx. On the same day, president Zanetti announced Lino Lardo as the new head coach. Lardo, who already coached the Black V's men's wing during the early 2010s, is also the coach of Italy's women's national team. The roster was completed within a few days: on 24 May, Virtus signed also Sabrina Cinili, a point guard from Famila Schio, on 27 May Ivana Dojkić, a Croatian shooting guard from UKS Praha on 29 May Myisha Hines-Allen, a small forward from Lattes Montpellier who became WNBA Champion in 2019, and on 30 May Brianna Turner, a power forward from Adelaide Lightning.

Despite good premises, in November 2021 the team was eliminated in the group stage of the EuroCup. On 19 April 2022, during the national semi-finals against Reyer Venezia, Lino Lardo was fired and his assistant Angela Gianolla became the new head coach. The team ousted Reyer Venezia by 2–1 in the national semi-finals, reaching the finals for the first time in its history and qualifying for the EuroLeague Women. However, Virtus was defeated 3–1 by Famila Schio.

In the following season, Giampiero Ticchi became the new head coach and the club signed important international players like Iliana Rupert, Cheyenne Parker and Kitija Laksa. In 2022–23, Virtus played for the first time in the EuroLeague Women, but it was ousted in the regular season with a winning record of 5–9. The club ended the Italian championship's season at the first place but, once again, it lost the national finals against Famila Schio by 2–0. During the first game of the series in PalaDozza, Virtus set a new all-time record for LBF with 5,337 attendances. At the beginning of the following season, Virtus won its first ever title, the Italian Basketball Supercup.

On 20 June 2024, Baraldi announced that Virtus would not register for the following season and that the resources thus freed up would be diverted towards the youth sector, both men's and women's.

== Season by season ==
Season	Tier	League	Pos.	W–L	Italian Cup	Other competitions		European competitions		
2019–20	1	LBF	13th (Note: Season cancelled due to COVID-19 pandemic)	5–14						
2020–21	1	LBF	4th	20–11	Semi-finalist					
2021–22	1	LBF	2nd	23–11	Runners-up			2 EuroCup	RS	2–4
2022–23	1	LBF	2nd	28–4	Semi-finalist			1 EuroLeague	RS	5–9
2023–24	1	LBF	5th	21–6	Quarterfinalist	Supercup	C	1 EuroLeague	RS	7–7

== Players ==
=== Current roster ===
Segafredo Virtus Bologna roster
Players
Coaches

Pos.	No.	Nat.	Name	Ht.	Wt.	Age
G	1	(Italy)	Del Piero, Beatrice	1.80 m (5 ft 11 in)		30 – 17 April 1996
PG	6	(Italy)	Pasa, Francesca	1.73 m (5 ft 8 in)		26 – 22 May 2000
F/C	12	(France)	Rupert, Iliana	1.94 m (6 ft 4 in)		25 – 12 July 2001
SF	15	(Italy)	Barberis, Beatrice	1.76 m (5 ft 9 in)		30 – 6 November 1995
C	17	(Italy)	Laterza, Maria	1.91 m (6 ft 3 in)		37 – 9 September 1989
SG	18	(Croatia)	Dojkić, Ivana	1.80 m (5 ft 11 in)		28 – 24 December 1997
C	22	(Italy)	Andrè, Olbis Futo	1.92 m (6 ft 4 in)		27 – 25 December 1998
SF	24	(Italy)	Zandalasini, Cecilia	1.86 m (6 ft 1 in)		30 – 16 March 1996
PG	29	(Italy)	Orsili, Alessandra	1.70 m (5 ft 7 in)		25 – 4 October 2001
C	32	(United States)	Parker, Cheyenne	1.93 m (6 ft 4 in)		34 – 22 August 1992
SG	33	(Latvia)	Laksa, Kitija	1.82 m (6 ft 0 in)		30 – 21 May 1996
SF	46	(Italy)	Cinili, Sabrina (C)	1.91 m (6 ft 3 in)		37 – 22 April 1989

Head coach

- (Italy) Giampiero Ticchi

Assistant coach(es)

- (Italy) Jordan Losi
- (Italy) Giacomo Campanella

Legend

- (C) Team captain
- Injured

- Roster
Updated: 30 March 2023

Note: Flags indicate national team eligibility at FIBA-sanctioned events. Players may hold other non-FIBA nationalities not displayed.
