= Massimo Zanetti =

Italian entrepreneur

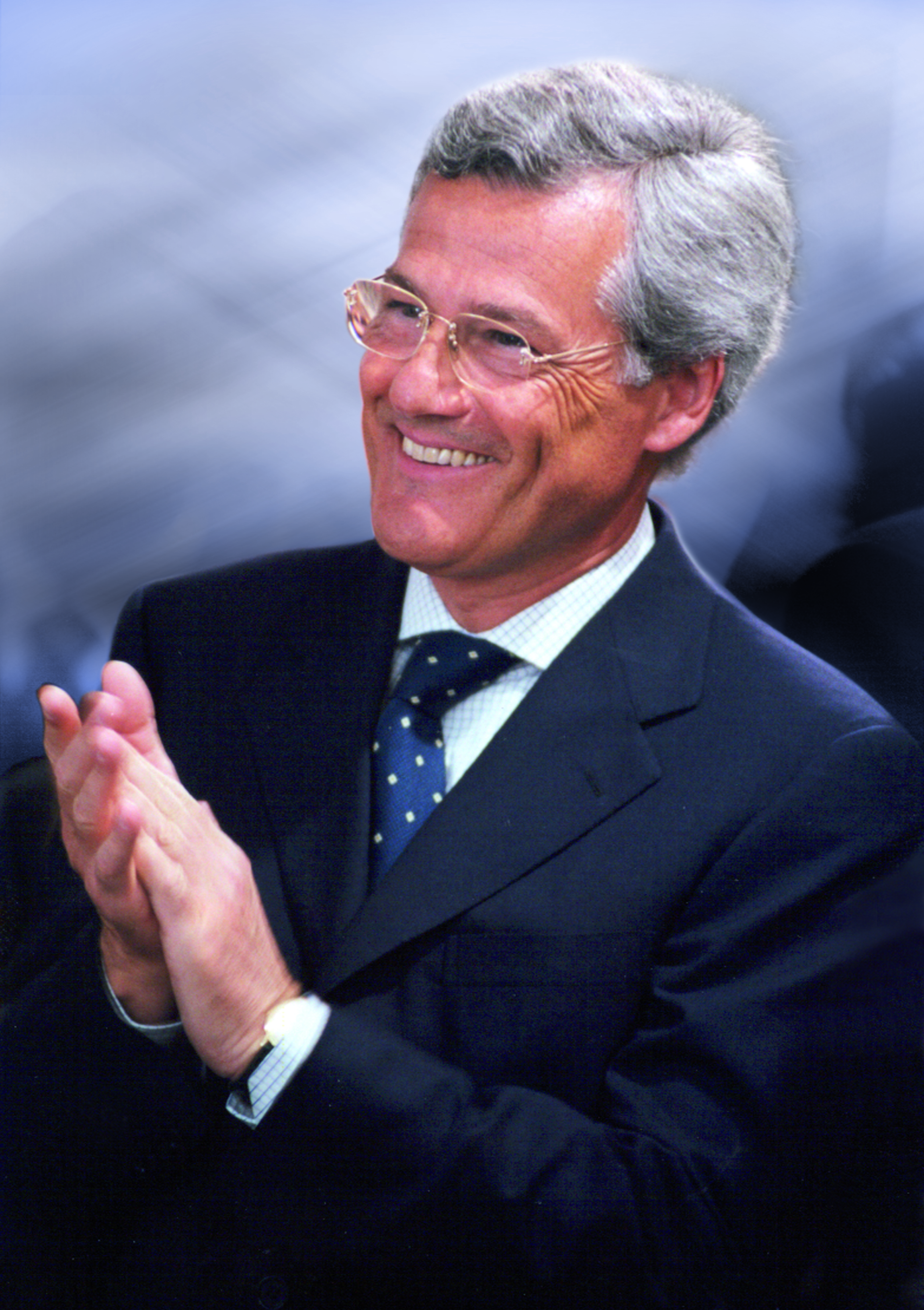

Member of the Senate of the Republic
- In office 15 April 1994 – 8 May 1996
- Constituency: Treviso

Personal details
- Born: 12 February 1948 (age 78) Treviso, Italy
- Party: Forza Italia (1994–96)
- Height: 1.78 m (5 ft 10 in)
- Spouse: Sigrid Guillion Mangilli
- Children: Laura, Matteo
- Profession: Owner of Segafredo; Owner of Virtus Bologna
- Basketball career

Virtus Bologna
- Position: President
- League: LBA; EuroLeague

Career history
- 2016–present: Virtus Bologna

Career highlights
- EuroCup champion (2022); FIBA Champions League champion (2019); 2x Italian League champion (2021, 2025); 3x Italian Supercup winner (2021, 2022, 2023); Italian 2nd Division champion (2017); Italian LNP Cup winner (2017); Italian Supercup Women winner (2023)

Massimo Zanetti (born 12 February 1948 in Treviso) is an Italian entrepreneur and former politician, owner of Segafredo, a global coffee company. Since 2016, Zanetti has also owned the Italian basketball team Virtus Bologna, one of the most successful teams in Europe, of which he formally became president in October 2021. He is often called, by the media, the "King of Coffee".

== Biography ==
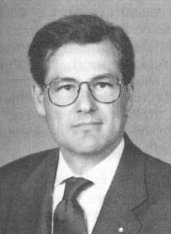
Zanetti as a senator in 1994

Massimo Zanetti was born in Treviso in 1948. During 1970s, he moved to Bologna where he acquired the local company Segafredo, a historic coffee producer with a fairly well known brand. Zanetti gave impulse and new vitality to the company, to which he added its own brand "Segafredo Zanetti", opening it to international markets, diversifying it with the creation of a worldwide network, making it, in a few years, one of the top coffee producers in the world. The holding company, Massimo Zanetti Beverage Group (MZB), coordinates the group's activities and invests about 1,200 million dollars. The Segafredo headquarter is based in Pianoro, in the Bologna hinterland.

In the 1994 general election, he was elected Senator for Forza Italia, the liberal conservative party founded by the media magnate Silvio Berlusconi. The legislature ended in 1996, after the fall of Berlusconi's government in 1995 and the short-lived technocratic cabinet of Lamberto Dini. Zanetti decided not to run for a second term in the 1996 general election.

In the 2013 local elections, Zanetti ran for mayor of Treviso, supported by Civic Choice, a liberal and centrist party of former Prime Minister Mario Monti, getting 10.57% and arriving third, not accessing the ballot. After a first attempt to agree with the center-right candidate Giancarlo Gentilini, he decided not to give voting instructions to his voters.

=== Sports activities ===
The Segafredo brand appeared as the main sponsor on the jerseys of Bologna F.C. between 1986 and 1989, on those of Gorizia Basketball between 1984 and 1988 and on those of A.C.D. Treviso in different years between 1986 and 2006.

On 23 December 2010, after a long and troubled negotiation lasting about a month, the Bologna 2010 entrepreneurial group, led by Giovanni Consorte, bought 100% of the Bologna football team from Sergio Porcedda and Francesca Menarini. At the same time, Zanetti assumed the position of president. The office of honorary president, not operative, was held by the popular singer Gianni Morandi.

On 21 January 2011, Zanetti unexpectedly resigned as chairman of Bologna and as a director of the holding company due to contrasts with the other shareholders. After his resignation, Zanetti still remained the relative majority shareholder of the club. In March 2011, the entrepreneur and former president Alfredo Cazzola tried to take over the shares of Zanetti, but the negotiations were not successful, so Zanetti remained a shareholder, although no longer intending to participate in the club's life.

However, on 25 September 2014, he announced his willingness to become the majority shareholder again. The negotiations that would have provided for the acquisition of 51% of the club's shares and the return of Zanetti as president of the club failed in October 2014, when the club was bought by the Canadian entrepreneur Joey Saputo.

In 2016, Segafredo entered Trek–Segafredo, a professional road bicycle racing team, which signed, among others Alberto Contador, John Degenkolb, Ivan Basso and Ryder Hesjedal.

==== Virtus Bologna ====
In 2016, Segafredo Zanetti became the main sponsor of Virtus Bologna, the main basketball team in the town and one of the most successful ones in Italy and Europe. On 23 March 2017, he participated in the capital increase of the club, with 47% of shares, becoming de facto the club's owner. Under Zanetti's ownership, on 5 May 2019, Virtus won its fifth European title, the Basketball Champions League in Antwerp, defeating Iberostar Tenerife 73–61. The BCL was the team's first European title after ten years. In June 2021, after having knocked out 3–0 both Basket Treviso in the quarterfinals and New Basket Brindisi in the semifinals, Virtus defeated 4–0 its historic rival Olimpia Milano in the national finals, winning its 16th national title and the first one after twenty years.

In July 2019, Virtus opened a women's basketball wing, to participate in the Serie A1 championship, winning its first ever title two years later, with the Italian Basketball Supercup.

On 28 October 2021, Zanetti was elected president of Virtus, succeeding Giuseppe Sermasi as the head of the club, and became the only shareholder after a €2 million capital increase. After having ousted Lietkabelis, Ulm and Valencia in the first three rounds of the playoffs, on 11 May 2022, Virtus defeated Frutti Extra Bursaspor by 80–67 at the Segafredo Arena, winning its first EuroCup and qualifying for the EuroLeague after 14 years.

In January 2025, following disputes regarding the club's management, Zanetti removed his long-time associate Luca Baraldi as CEO of Virtus, ending his 6 years-long tenure. In June 2025, after having eliminated Reyer Venezia 3–2 and their arch-rival Milan 3–1, Virtus reached its fifth finals in a row, where it defeated Brescia 3–0, claiming the Italian championship title for the 17th time. For Zanetti, this was the second scudetto of his presidency.

== Electoral history ==
Election	House	Constituency	Party	Votes	Result
1994	Senate of the Republic	Veneto – Treviso	FI	67,210	Elected

=== First-past-the-post elections ===
1994 general election (S): Veneto — Treviso
Candidate	Coalition	Votes	%
Massimo Zanetti	Pole of Freedoms	67,210	42.5
Ulderico Bernardi	Pact for Italy	32,790	20.7
Domenico Luciano	Alliance of Progressives	31,718	20.1
Others		26,515	10.8
Total		158,233	100.0

=== Municipal elections ===
2013 municipal election: Treviso
Candidate	Coalition	Votes	%	Votes	%
Giovanni Manildo	Centre-left coalition	17,461	42.6	21,403	55.5
Giancarlo Gentilini	Centre-right coalition	14,283	34.8	17,159	44.5
Massimo Zanetti	Centrist coalition	4,337	10.6		
Others		4.949	12.0		
Total		41,030	100.0	38,562	100.0
