= 2021–22 EuroLeague Women =

EuroLeague Women
- Season: 2021–22
- Dates: Qualifying: 21–23 September 2021; Regular Season: 6 October 2021 – 10 April 2022
- Teams: Competition proper: 16; Total: 20

Finals
- Champions: (Hungary) Sopron Basket (1st title)
- Runners-up: (Turkey) Fenerbahçe
- Third place: (Spain) Perfumerías Avenida
- Fourth place: (Czech Republic) ZVVZ USK Praha
- Final Four MVP: Gabby Williams (Sopron)

The 2021–22 EuroLeague Women was the 64th edition of the European women's club basketball championship organized by FIBA, and the 26th edition since being rebranded as the EuroLeague Women.

In February 2022, the Russian teams (UMMC Ekaterinburg, Dynamo Kursk, and MBA Moscow) were expelled from the tournament by FIBA for the Euroleague Women playoffs, and suspended, due to Russia's invasion of Ukraine.

Sopron Basket won its first-ever championship after defeating Fenerbahçe in the final of the Final Four.

== Team allocation ==
A total of 20 teams from 10 countries will participate in the 2021–22 EuroLeague Women.

=== Teams ===
League positions of the previous season shown in parentheses (TH: EuroLeague Women title holders; EC: EuroCup Women title holders).

Regular season
(Czech Republic) ZVVZ USK Praha (1st)	(Russia) UMMC Ekaterinburg^{TH} (1st)
(France) Basket Landes (1st)	(Russia) Dynamo Kursk (2nd)
(France) BLMA (2nd)	(Russia) MBA Moscow (3rd)
(Hungary) Sopron Basket (1st)	(Spain) Perfumerías Avenida (1st)
(Italy) Reyer Venezia (1st)	(Spain) Spar Girona (CW, 3rd)
(Latvia) TTT Riga (1st)	(Turkey) Fenerbahçe (1st)
(Poland) VBW Arka Gdynia (1st)	(Turkey) Galatasaray (2nd)
Qualifying round
Conference 1	Conference 2
(Hungary) KSC Szekszárd (2nd)	(France) Tango Bourges Basket (3rd)
(Romania) ACS Sepsi SIC (1st)	(Italy) Beretta Famila Schio (2nd)
(Turkey) Kayseri Basketbol (10th)	(Spain) Valencia Basket^{EC} (2nd)

== Referees ==
Referees of the 2021–22 season^{1}
(Austria) Silvia Jury; (Austria) Christoph Rohacky; (Austria) Goran Sljivić; (Azerbaijan) Alakbar Hasanov; (Belarus) Lizaveta Famina; (Belarus) Piotr Ivashkov; (Belgium) Martin Van Hoye; (Bosnia and Herzegovina) Haris Bijedić; (Bosnia and Herzegovina) Hrvoje Ćavar; (Bosnia and Herzegovina) Mila Čavara; (Bosnia and Herzegovina) Bojan Jovanić; (Bosnia and Herzegovina) Ivan Miličević; (Bosnia and Herzegovina) Goran Stojančević; (Bulgaria) Ventsislav Velikov; (Croatia) Franko Gracin; (Croatia) Alfred Jovović; (Croatia) Krešimir Katić; (Croatia) Josip Mikulić; (Croatia) Nikola Perlić; (Croatia) Jelena Tomić; (Cyprus) Maria Ignatiou; (Czech Republic) Jan Baloun; (Czech Republic) Petr Blahout; (Czech Republic) Martin Kučírek; (Czech Republic) Veronika Vávrová; (Denmark) Andrada Monika Csender; (Estonia) Mart Uuehendrik; (Finland) Ariadna Chueca Moreno; (Finland) Ville Selkee	(France) Amel Dahra; (France) Alexandre Maret; (France) Valentin Oliot; (France) Marion Ortis; (Georgia (country)) Maka Kupatadze; (Georgia (country)) Kirile Tvauri; (Gibraltar) James Kerry Dominique; (United Kingdom) Iain Macdonald; (United Kingdom) Simon Unsworth; (Greece) Anastasios Kardaris; (Greece) Stylianos Simeonidis; (Greece) Emmanouil Tsolakos; (Hungary) Cecília Tóth; (Republic of Ireland) Emma Perry; (Italy) Andrea Bongiorni; (Italy) Silvia Marziali; (Latvia) Ritvars Helmšteins; (Latvia) Kristīne Simanoviča; (Lithuania) Juozas Barkauskas; (Lithuania) Gintaras Vitkauskas; (Moldova) Dumitru Stasiev; (Montenegro) Ognjen Jokić; (Montenegro) Milosav Kaluđerović; (Montenegro) Mladen Lučić; (Montenegro) Ivana Radinović; (Montenegro) Suzana Vujičić; (North Macedonia) Alija Ferevski; (North Macedonia) Zoran Mitrovski; (Norway) Nikola Bejat	(Norway) Gizella Viola Györgyi; (Poland) Paulina Gajdosz; (Poland) Łukasz Jankowski; (Poland) Ewa Matuszewska; (Portugal) Diogo Martins; (Portugal) Sonia Teixeira; (Romania) Alin Faur; (Romania) Amalia Marchiş; (Romania) Alexandra Stan; (Russia) Elena Chernova; (Russia) Ilya Putenko; (Serbia) Ivana Ivanović; (Serbia) Jasmina Juras; (Serbia) Nemanja Ninković; (Serbia) Jelena Smiljanić; (Slovakia) Pavel Fuska; (Slovenia) Goran Grbić; (Slovenia) Diana Lapanović; (Slovenia) Marko Vučkovič; (Spain) Yasmina Alcaraz Moreno; (Spain) Francisco Araña; (Spain) Esperanza Mendoza Holgado; (Spain) Javier Torres Sánchez; (Spain) Raúl Zamorano Sánchez; (Turkey) Duhan Köyiçi; (Turkey) Mehmet Şahin; (Turkey) Ali Şakacı; (Turkey) Özge Şentürk; (Turkey) Sinem Tetik	Notes: 1. Every BCL official is eligible to referee the EuroLeague Women.

== Round and draw dates ==
=== Schedule ===
Phase	Round	Round date
Qualifying round		21–23 September 2021
Regular season	Matchday 1	6–7 October 2021
Regular season	Matchday 2	13–14 October 2021
Regular season	Matchday 3	20–21 October 2021
Regular season	Matchday 4	27 October 2021
Regular season	Matchday 5	2–3 November 2021
Regular season	Matchday 6	24 November 2021
Regular season	Matchday 7	1–2 December 2021
Regular season	Matchday 8	7–9 December 2021
Regular season	Matchday 9	14–16 December 2021
Regular season	Matchday 10	20–21 December 2021
Regular season	Matchday 11	12–13 January 2022
Regular season	Matchday 12	19–20 January 2022
Regular season	Matchday 13	26–27 January 2022
Regular season	Matchday 14	1 February 2022
Quarterfinals	First leg	23 February 2022
Quarterfinals	Second leg	2 March 2022
Quarterfinals	Third leg	9 March 2022
Final Four	Semifinals	8 April 2022
Final Four	Final	10 April 2022

=== Draw ===
The draw was held on 19 August 2021 in Freising, Germany.

Draw rules are as follows.

- A maximum of two clubs from the same country can be in the same Regular Season group for countries that have up to three clubs in total.
- Each group can have a maximum of two countries that are represented by two clubs each.
- If there are exactly two clubs from the same country, those clubs shall be drawn into different groups if possible.

Seed 1	Seed 2	Seed 3	Seed 4
~~(Russia) UMMC Ekaterinburg~~ (Turkey) Fenerbahçe	~~(Russia) Dynamo Kursk~~ (Spain) Perfumerías Avenida	(Czech Republic) ZVVZ USK Praha (Hungary) Sopron Basket	(Spain) Spar Girona (France) BLMA

Seed 5	Seed 6	Seed 7	Seed 8
(Latvia) TTT Riga (Turkey) Galatasaray	(Italy) Reyer Venezia (France) Basket Landes	(Poland) VBW Arka Gdynia; ~~(Russia) MBA Moscow~~	Qualifier 1 Qualifier 2

== Qualifying round ==
=== Conference 1 ===
Pos	Team	Pld	W	L	PF	PA	PD	Pts	Qualification	SZE	SEP	KAY
1	(Hungary) KSC Szekszárd	2	2	0	143	126	+17	4	Regular season		63–56	
2	(Romania) ACS Sepsi SIC (H)	2	1	1	135	141	−6	3	EuroCup Women			79–78
3	(Turkey) Kayseri Basketbol	2	0	2	148	159	−11	2	EuroCup Women	70–80		

Source: FIBA
(H) Hosts

=== Conference 2 ===
Pos	Team	Pld	W	L	PF	PA	PD	Pts	Qualification	SCH	BOU	VAL
1	(Italy) Beretta Famila Schio (H)	2	2	0	125	105	+20	4	Regular season		69–57	
2	(France) Tango Bourges Basket	2	1	1	132	141	−9	3	EuroCup Women			75–72
3	(Spain) Valencia Basket	2	0	2	120	131	−11	2	EuroCup Women	48–56		

Source: FIBA
(H) Hosts

== Regular season ==
=== Group A ===
Pos	Team	Pld	W	L	PF	PA	PD	Pts	Qualification	EKA	AVE	USK	BLM	TTT	VEN	~~MBA~~	SZE
1	~~(Russia) UMMC Ekaterinburg~~	14	14	0	1222	944	+278	28	Excluded		110–102	75–73	108–53	75–60	75–69	104–65	89–52
2	(Spain) Perfumerías Avenida	14	11	3	1130	978	+152	25	Advance to quarterfinals	67–93		85–75	88–67	72–41	110–69	70–64	96–54
3	(Czech Republic) ZVVZ USK Praha	14	10	4	1170	900	+270	24	Advance to quarterfinals	77–90	80–55		89–54	84–64	88–53	92–61	83–56
4	(France) BLMA	14	6	8	959	1078	−119	20	Advance to quarterfinals	73–92	65–78	75–74		63–54	52–74	86–77	82–57
5	(Latvia) TTT Riga	14	6	8	825	983	−158	20	Advance to quarterfinals	56–71	51–71	52–103	45–80		71–57	64–59	69–68
6	(Italy) Umana Reyer Venezia	14	5	9	934	990	−56	19	Transfer to EuroCup Women	67–74	56–71	75–84	79–59	54–62		61–62	80–59
7	(Russia) ~~MBA Moscow~~	14	4	10	943	1064	−121	18	Excluded	63–84	69–77	54–79	98–78	61–68	72–75		65–62
8	(Hungary) KSC Szekszárd	14	0	14	855	1101	−246	14	Transfer to EuroCup Women	67–82	84–88	51–89	65–72	65–68	51–65	64–73	

Source: FIBA

=== Group B ===
Pos	Team	Pld	W	L	PF	PA	PD	Pts	Qualification	FEN	SOP	SCH	~~KUR~~	GIR	LAN	GAL	GDY
1	(Turkey) Fenerbahçe	14	11	3	1108	892	+216	25	Advance to quarterfinals		73–47	82–65	83–58	78–57	65–70	107–62	87–67
2	(Hungary) Sopron Basket	14	8	6	935	897	+38	22	Advance to quarterfinals	59–82		67–58	79–72	53–68	76–54	73–44	67–40
3	(Italy) Beretta Famila Schio	14	8	6	1011	966	+45	22	Advance to quarterfinals	64–60	71–70		64–80	68–76	96–56	76–73	75–61
4	(Russia) ~~Dynamo Kursk~~	14	8	6	1038	1021	+17	22	Excluded	57–63	73–77	74–93		92–75	75–57	78–76	86–76
5	(Spain) Spar Girona	14	7	7	972	977	−5	21	Advance to quarterfinals	71–59	63–68	65–55	66–71		70–78	55–69	80–70
6	(France) Basket Landes	14	7	7	966	1050	−84	21	Transfer to EuroCup Women	76–93	61–52	64–79	78–75	71–80		71–62	79–70
7	(Turkey) Galatasaray	14	5	9	968	1038	−70	19	Transfer to EuroCup Women	69–89	67–61	67–80	70–80	80–68	83–64		71–60
8	(Poland) VBW Arka Gdynia	14	2	12	935	1092	−157	16		70–87	71–86	71–67	64–67	65–78	74–87	76–75	

Source: FIBA

== Quarterfinals ==
Team 1	Series	Team 2	Game 1	Game 2	Game 3
Perfumerías Avenida (Spain)	2–1	(Spain) Spar Girona	77–63	79–81	74–65
Sopron Basket (Hungary)	2–0	(France) BLMA	60–42	72–65	
ZVVZ USK Praha (Czech Republic)	2–1	(Italy) Beretta Famila Schio	72–70	56–69	90–77
Fenerbahçe (Turkey)	2–0	(Latvia) TTT Riga	77–56	88–65	

== Final Four ==
=== Bracket ===
Semifinals
8 April
(Spain) Perfumerías Avenida	69
(Hungary) Sopron Basket	74
8 April
(Czech Republic) ZVVZ USK Praha	74
(Turkey) Fenerbahçe	83

Final
10 April
(Hungary) Sopron Basket	60
(Turkey) Fenerbahçe	55
Third place
10 April
(Spain) Perfumerías Avenida	71
(Czech Republic) ZVVZ USK Praha	59

=== Semifinals ===
8 April 2022	Perfumerías Avenida (Spain)	69–74	(Hungary) Sopron Basket	Istanbul
17:00 (UTC+3)	Scoring by quarter: 13–22, 18–25, 21–17, 17–10
	Pts: Copper 23; Rebs: Copper, Alarie 6 Asts: Rodríguez, Cazorla 3 PIR: Copper 15	Boxscore	Pts: Brooks 27; Rebs: Határ 10; Asts: Williams 6 PIR: Brooks 26	Arena: Ülker Sports and Event Hall; Referees: Jelena Tomić (CRO), Beniamino Manuel Attard (ITA), Mihkel Männiste (EST)

8 April 2022	ZVVZ USK Praha (Czech Republic)	74–83	(Turkey) Fenerbahçe	Istanbul
20:00 (UTC+3)	Scoring by quarter: 23–28, 22–10, 18–21, 11–24
	Pts: Oblak 22; Rebs: Thomas 14; Asts: Thomas 8 PIR: Oblak 24	Boxscore	Pts: Iagupova 24; Rebs: Williams 11; Asts: Iagupova 7 PIR: Iagupova 27	Arena: Ülker Sports and Event Hall; Referees: Paulo Marques (POR), Amel Dahra (FRA), Gatis Saliņš (LAT)

=== Third place game ===
10 April 2022	Perfumerías Avenida (Spain)	71–59	(Czech Republic) ZVVZ USK Praha	Istanbul
14:00 (UTC+3)	Scoring by quarter: 12–19, 20–18, 22–9, 17–13
	Pts: Samuelson 25; Rebs: Copper 8 Asts: Copper, Cazorla 5 PIR: Samuelson 28	Boxscore	Pts: Jones 26; Rebs: Thomas 9 Asts: Voráčková 7 PIR: Voráčková, Jones 23	Arena: Ülker Sports and Event Hall; Referees: Özlem Yalman (TUR), Jelena Tomić (CRO), Viola Györgyi (ROU)

=== Final ===
10 April 2022	Sopron Basket (Hungary)	60–55	(Turkey) Fenerbahçe	Istanbul
17:00 (UTC+3)	Scoring by quarter: 16–6, 13–13, 16–19, 15–17
	Pts: Williams 16; Rebs: Brooks 11; Asts: Williams, Fegyverneky 3 PIR: Williams 17	Boxscore	Pts: Iagupova 13; Rebs: Williams 8 Asts: Iagupova 5 PIR: Çakır 12	Arena: Ülker Sports and Event Hall; Referees: Paulo Marques (POR), Beniamino Manuel Attard (ITA) Gatis Saliņš (LAT)

2021–22 EuroLeague Women Champions

Sopron Basket
First title

== Awards ==
=== EuroLeague Final Four MVP ===
- (France) Gabby Williams ( (Hungary) Sopron Basket)

=== MVP of the Month ===
Month	Player	Team	Ref.
2021
October	(Slovenia) Eva Lisec	(Russia) Dynamo Kursk	
November	(France) Sandrine Gruda	(Italy) Beretta Famila Schio	
December	(United States) Brionna Jones	(Czech Republic) ZVVZ USK Praha	
2022
January	(United States) Natasha Howard	(Russia) Dynamo Kursk	
February	(United States) Alyssa Thomas	(Czech Republic) ZVVZ USK Praha	

== See also ==
- 2021–22 EuroCup Women
