= Segafredo =

Segafredo may refer to:

- Segafredo Zanetti, an Italian coffee company
- Virtus Segafredo Arena, a temporary indoor arena located in Bologna, Italy

== See also ==
- Trek-Segafredo
