= Arkady Leokum =

Arkady Leokum (October 3, 1915 – September 2, 2008) was a 20th-century writer notable for both his adult pulp fiction and best-selling juvenile encyclopedic-knowledge books. Born in Russia, he attended the City College of New York. He lived in West Stockbridge, Massachusetts.

== Career in advertising and American radio ==
Throughout his career in advertising and American radio, Leokum was listed in various agencies as a New York agency executive, creative director, and copywriter. In June, 1954, the Broadcast Telecasting trade paper announced Leokum's move to Grey Advertising from "vice-president and copy chief, Bryan Houston, Inc., and before that vice-president and copy-chief of Robert Orr Assoc., to Grey Advertising, in same capacities, effective July 6."

In the advertising world, Leokum may be best known for his slogan for the Chock full o'Nuts coffee ad campaign, a slogan that pushed Chock full o'Nuts from a seventh-rank position to third in New York City: "Don't spend the extra money for this coffee (unless you're just plain crazy about good coffee)." In the November 24, 1958, issue of Broadcasting Magazine ("a news journal for the broadcasting Industry that began covering radio in 1931 and expanded to include television as that medium developed"; renamed "Broadcasting & Cable" in 1993 and "B&C" in 2002), Grey Advertising, Inc. reported "a gain of more than $1 million over 1957 to such new accounts as Westinghouse Electric, Inc., Ronson Corp, and General Electric Co." Spot-TV radio advertisers active during the year were Block Drug Co., Greyhound, Chock full o'Nuts Corp., Chunky Chocolate Corp., Hoffman Beverage Co., G. Kreuger Brewing Co., and R.H. Macy Co."

Leokum spoke about the characteristics of what makes a good copywriter. In March, 1958 U.S. Radio interview titled "Grey's Leokum Cites Values of Local Copywriting," he declared: "At Grey we respect the writer who stands for an idea. He may be proved wrong and have to change it, but it's the man who goes down bleeding and dying who usually does the best job. I don't want to sound corny about this, but a copywriter knows that's what he wants to be. In fact he'd be miserable doing anything else in an agency, unless it's supervising other copywriters. I wouldn't exactly call copywriting a call from above, but if you don't care about it you aren't likely to be good at it." The U.S. Radio editorial added: "The Grey executive is also the author of a book published in 1947, "Please Send Me, Absolutely Free", inspired, in part, by the advertising business.

In March, 1958, while vice president and creative director of Grey Advertising, Inc., Leokum pointed out that "the local radio writer has a great many opportunities to break out and do interesting things, because he is not likely to be bogged down in procedures." He said "the radio writer must have an ear for human speech, a certain 'naturalness,' and the ability to present his material dramatically. But a good copywriter should be able to write for all media." The 1958 interview, titled "Interesting Things", stated that "Mr. Leokum believes good copy writing requires a specialized talent all its own. When he is hiring a young copywriter he often asks him to make up a sample book of his work. He suggests that he choose two examples of current commercial campaigns, one good and one bad in his opinion. The prospective employee then writes another commercial in each series, pointing out the merits of the good campaign and the faults of the bad."

Earlier, as vice-president of Robert W. Orr and Assoc. of New York City, he was listed in The Radio Annual and Television Yearbook, 1949, a "1,200 pages chronicle the vital statistical record of last year's achievements and tomorrow's planning" that was "dedicated to the men and women in the progressive field of broadcasting" and covered "the story of networks expansion in AM, FM and TV; the broadening scope of station and agency activities and all-important data about sponsors, commercial programs, producers, artists and allied services."

== Tell Me Why series ==
Leokum was the writer and creator of the prolific "Tell Me Why" book series of the 1960s and 1970s, which asked and answered questions for curious youth about all facets of life, such as: Why does Saturn have rings? What are the different types of clouds? How does an octopus swim? Why does a tiger have stripes? How do flowers grow?

- Tell Me Why (1965)
- More Tell Me Why: Answers to Over Four Hundred Questions Children Ask Most Often (1967)
- Still More Tell Me Why: Answers to Hundreds of Questions Children Ask (1968)
- More More More Tell Me Why (1968)
- The Quiz Book from Tell Me Why (1968)
- Puzzles, Stunts, Brain Teasers, and Tricks From Tell Me Why (1969)
- Lots More Tell Me Why: Answers to Hundreds of Questions Children Ask (1972)
- Tell Me Why: Answers to Questions Children Ask About Love, Sex, and Babies (1974)
- Animals, Insects, Fishes, and Birds: How They Live and Do What They Do (1976)
- How Things Are Made: How They Work . . . Where They Come From (1976)
- How Things Began: Who Made Them First . . . How New Ideas Got Started (1976)
- How Things Got Started: How We Use, Enjoy, and Believe in Them (1976)
- The Human Body: How It Works . . . How Things Happen to It (1976)
- The World We Live In: How and Why Things Happen on Earth (1976)
- The Curious Book: Fascinating Facts About People, Places, and Things (1976)
- Another Tell Me Why: Enlightening Answers to Questions Children Ask (1977)
- (with Paul Posnick and Stanley Corwin)Where Words Were Born (1977)

The first-known reference to the "Tell Me Why" is a 96-page paperback by Arkady Leokum, published by Scholastic Book Services in 1958, of answers to the children's question "TELL ME WHY?" It was based on the newspaper column "It's Amazing (Tell Me Why)" syndicated by the George Matthew Adams Newspaper Service.

Beyond the books, Leokum's "Tell Me Why" later became a literacy and instructional series for use in classrooms, distributed by educational media content producer TMW Media Group Inc.

== Plays and novels ==
In 1971 and 1972, PBS presented two Arkady Leokum plays as television specials, Enemies starring Sam Jaffe and Ned Glass; and Neighbors featuring Andrew Duggan, Jane Wyatt, and Cicely Tyson. Producer-Director Fielder Cook (1923-2003), who won Emmy Awards for producing Brigadoon and directing The Price, directed Leokum's social commentary.

As a stage play, Enemies was written by Arkady Leokum; directed by Fielder Cook, an award-winning director of films and television dramas; produced by Lewis Freedman. It was originally broadcast by PBS in 1971 on its television program, Hollywood Television Theatre (KCET). "This humorous short play is based on the author's experiences as a waiter at a Catskills resort," stated the official PBS synopsis, in which "Oscar nominee Sam Jaffe (The Asphalt Jungle) portrays a humble, long-suffering New York Waiter who finally turns the tables on a regular, but intolerable, customer (Ned Glass) who delights in pestering him about the service. Both men are somewhat deceptive and the relationship between the two turns when it is revealed that the waiter is a skilled investor and an owner of the restaurant and building." As described in The Encyclopedia of Television Film Directors (Vol. 1) by Jerry Roberts, Enemies is a "sharply worded contemplation of the haves versus the have-nots." Neighbors, Roberts wrote, is about "boiling away race relations to reveal two very pointed examinations of the interpersonal relationships in marriages."

== Bibliography ==
=== Plays ===
- Friends and Enemies: Two Short Plays (1965)
- Neighbors: A Play " (1972)

=== Novels ===
- Please Send Me, Absolutely Free (1951, Popular Library)
- The Temple (1969, World Publishing Co.)
