= Gian Paolo Gobbo =

Italian politician

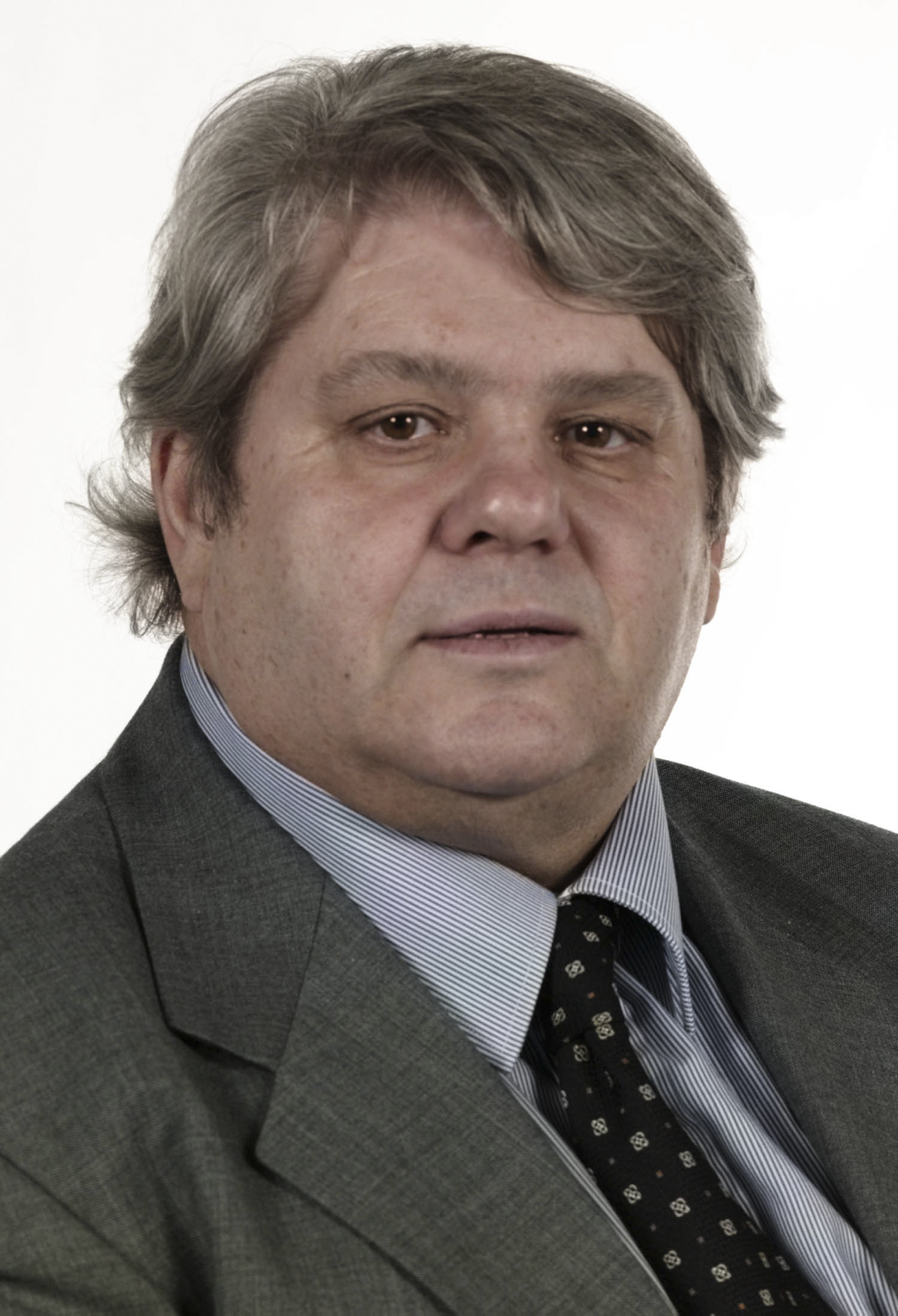
- Gobbo in 1999

Mayor of Treviso
- In office 10 June 2003 – 10 June 2013
- Preceded by: Giancarlo Gentilini
- Succeeded by: Giovanni Manildo

Member of the European Parliament
- In office 20 July 1999 – 22 June 2008
- Preceded by: Matteo Salvini

Personal details
- Born: Gian Paolo Gobbo; 1 April 1949 (age 77) Treviso, Italy
- Party: Lega Nord
- Height: 1.68 m (5 ft 6 in)

Gian Paolo Gobbo (born 1 April 1949) is an Italian politician. He is the President of Liga Veneta, the "national" section of Lega Nord in Veneto.

In 1978–1980, he was a founding member of Liga Veneta. In 1990 and 1995, he was elected to the Regional Council of Veneto and was Vice President of Veneto from 1994 to 1995.

Gobbo was a member of the European Parliament for the Lega Nord from 1999 to 2004 and then, again, from 2006 to 2009.

He was Mayor of Treviso from 2003 to 2013.

In January 2010, Gobbo was indicted along with 35 other members of the Lega Nord on charges relating to an attempt to form an armed criminal gang during the late 1990s.
