= Chase & Sanborn Coffee Company =

American coffee brand

Chase & Sanborn Coffee
- Current owner: Massimo Zanetti Beverage USA
- Country: United States
- Markets: Worldwide
- Previous owners: 1985 – Nestlé; 1999 – Sara Lee
- Website: www.shopmzb.com/chase-sanborn

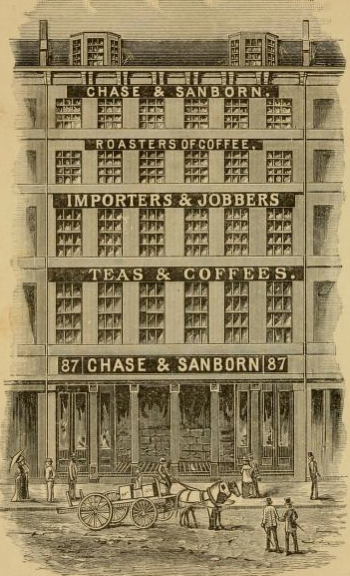
Illustration of the Chase & Sanborn building at 87 Broad St., Boston, Massachusetts

Chase & Sanborn Coffee is an American brand of coffee created by the coffee roasting and tea and coffee importing company of the same name, established in 1864 in Boston, Massachusetts, by Caleb Chase (1831-1908) and James Solomon Sanborn (1835–1903). It says that it is the first coffee company to pack and ship roasted coffee in sealed tins.

== History ==
When Standard Brands was formed in 1929, it acquired Chase & Sanborn, where it remained until 1981 when the company merged into Nabisco. Nabisco sold Chase & Sanborn to Florida importer General Coffee Co. owned by Colombian Alberto Duque in 1982.

Duque's creditors sold the business to Hills Bros. in 1984; Nestle became the new parent in 1985. Nestle sold its US coffee business to Sara Lee in 1999, and the Chase & Sanborn, Hills Bros., MJB, and Chock Full O' Nuts brands were sold to Massimo Zanetti Beverage Group in 2006.

== Gallery ==
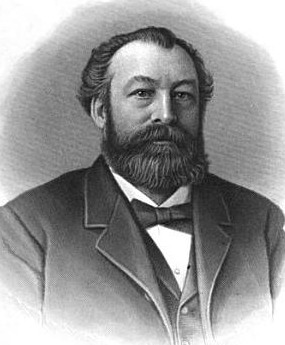
Caleb Chase, 1892

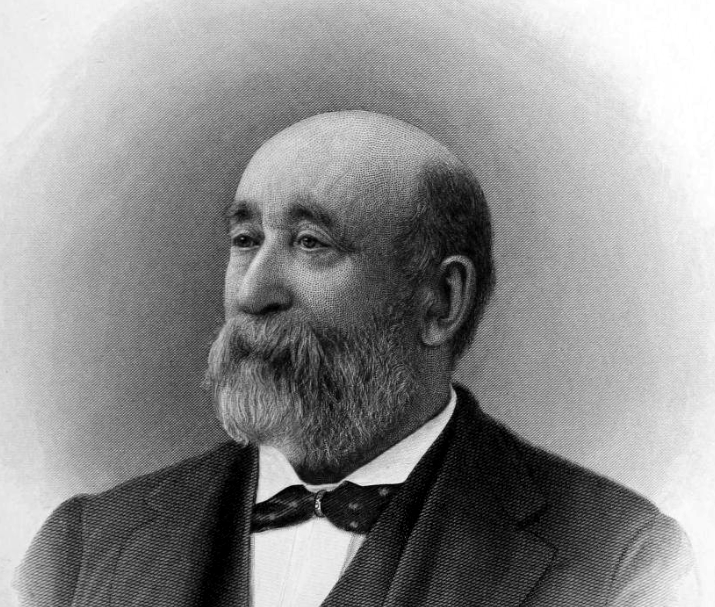
James Solomon Sanborn

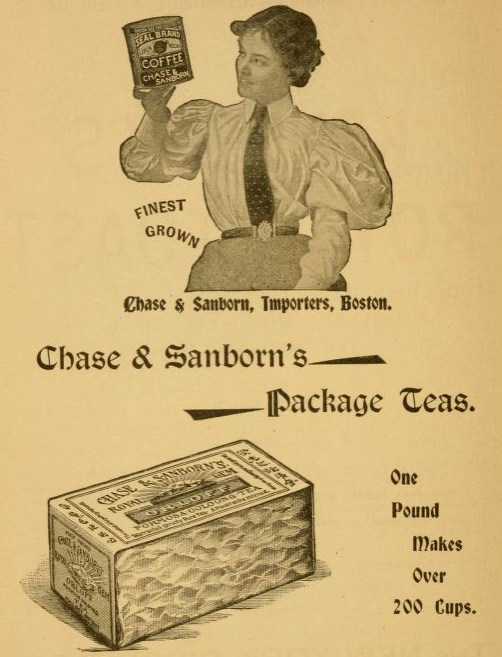
Advertisement for Chase & Sanborn's teas, 1897
