= MJB (coffee) =

American coffee company

MJB Coffee
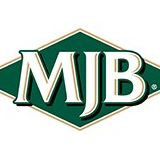
- Company type: Private
- Industry: Beverage
- Founded: 1899 in San Francisco, California
- Founder: Max Joseph Brandenstein
- Area served: United States
- Parent: Massimo Zanetti Beverage USA (2005–present); Sara Lee (1999-2005); Nestlé (1985-1999)
- Website: mjbcoffee.com

MJB Coffee is an American brand of coffee that is owned by Massimo Zanetti Beverage USA.

== History ==
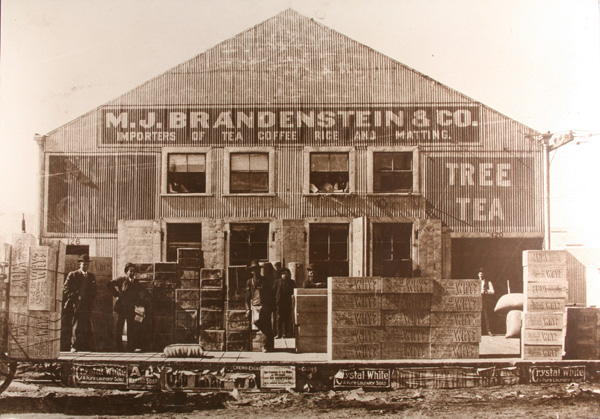
Early MJB Coffee building

After the California Gold Rush, San Francisco became a center of coffee importing and roasting in the western United States, spawning such future industry giants as Folgers Coffee and Hills Brothers Coffee.

In 1881 Max J. Brandenstein (1860-1925), son of tobacco wholesaler Joseph Brandenstein, began roasting coffee in the San Francisco Bay Area. In 1899 he established a tea, spice and coffee import business in his name that took over his brand with the assistance of brothers Mannie, Charlie, and Eddie. The firm's name was later changed to the MJB Co. to minimize sibling rivalry and disguise their German-Jewish origins.

In her 1978 memoir Coffee, Martinis and San Francisco, Ruth Bransten McDougall, the granddaughter of the founder, wrote that her father Mannie Brandenstein changed his name to Bransten to protect the business against anti-German sentiments during World War I, as well as to please his wife, whose family originated from France.

In 1900 Mannie Brandenstein debuted what was to become a well-known advertising campaign: "MJB Coffee Why?" In time, signs bearing the slogan appeared all over the San Francisco Bay Area.

"In 1898, Edward Norton, of New York, was granted a United States patent on a vacuum process for canning foods, subsequently applied to coffee. Others followed. Hills Brothers, of San Francisco, were the first to pack coffee in a vacuum, under the Norton patents, in 1900. M.J. Brandenstein & Company, of San Francisco, began to pack coffee in vacuum cans in 1914."

For the Panama-Pacific International Exposition of 1915 MJB created a temporary "ultramodern" coffee house featuring a giant cup and saucer on the roof with the illuminated word "WHY."

In the 1940s, MJB got endorsement from several of the industry’s glitterati, including the Cherokee Strip film stars promoting the brand. Moreover, a 1970s TV campaign of MJB taglined "tastes good when it should" featured actress Teri Garr. The campaign's success led to her being discovered by director Steven Spielberg, who cast her in his film Close Encounters of the Third Kind.

Ruth Bransten McDougall, Mannie’s daughter wrote a book named Under Mannie’s Hat that is a collection of memoirs of their family and brand history.

MJB was acquired by Nestle in 1985. The San Francisco headquarters were closed in 1997. In 1999 Sara Lee Corp. acquired MJB, Hills Brothers, and Chase & Sanborn from Nestle.

In 2005 MJB, Hills Brothers, Chase & Sanborn, and Chock full o'Nuts were purchased by Massimo Zanetti Beverage Group from Sara Lee for $82.5 million.
