= Giancarlo Gentilini =

Italian politician (1929–2025)

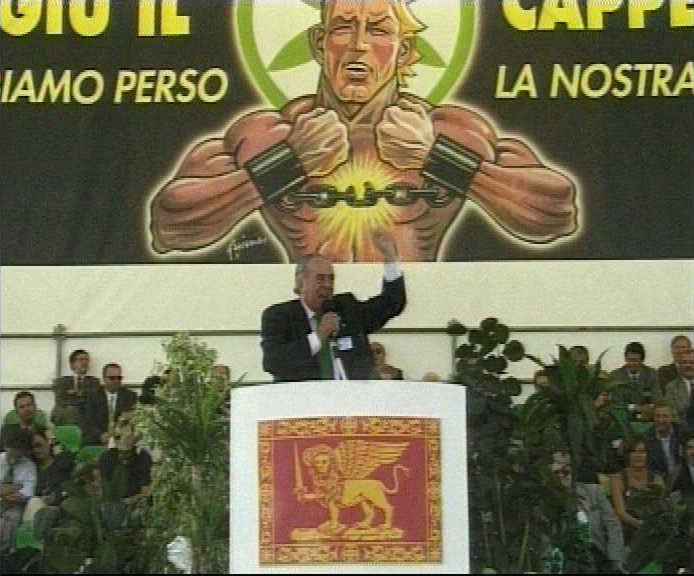
- Gentilini in 2006

Mayor of Treviso
- In office 5 December 1994 – 10 June 2003
- Preceded by: Gianfranco Gagliardi
- Succeeded by: Gian Paolo Gobbo

Personal details
- Born: Giancarlo Gentilini; 3 August 1929 Vittorio Veneto, Italy
- Died: 24 April 2025 (aged 95) Treviso, Italy
- Party: Lega Nord
- Height: 1.73 m (5 ft 8 in)
- Spouse(s): Teresa Pini (m. 1962; died 2017) Maria Assunta Pace (m. 2018)
- Children: 2
- Education: University of Padua (J.D.)
- Profession: Lawyer

Giancarlo Gentilini (3 August 1929 – 24 April 2025) was Deputy Mayor and Mayor of the city of Treviso, Italy.

== Life and career ==
Born in Vittorio Veneto, Province of Treviso, Gentilini studied at the University of Padua. He was a lawyer and worked as director at the legal bureau of the Cassamarca until his retirement. He was mayor of Treviso for two consecutive administrations, from 1994 to 1998 and 1998 to 2003, with the party of the Northern League. In 2003, Paolo Gobbo was elected mayor; Gentilini became deputy mayor, as current legislation prevents mayors from serving more than two consecutive terms. Gentilini's support was decisive in the victory of Gobbo.

In 2013, with Gobbo leaving office, Gentilini attempted to run for mayor again, with the support of center-right coalition (Lega Nord and The People of Freedom). However, in the first round, he came second with 34.81% of the votes, after center-left candidate, city councilman Giovanni Manildo. In the runoff, Manildo defeated Gentilini with 55.5% of the vote, and Gentilini became the opposition leader.

Gentilini died in Treviso on 24 April 2025, at the age of 95.
