= Chock full o'Nuts =

American coffee brand

- Product type: Coffeehouses and retail coffee
- Current owner: Massimo Zanetti Beverage Group
- Country: United States
- Introduced: 1932
- Markets: North America
- Previous owners: Chock Full o'Nuts; Sara Lee Corporation
- Tagline: "The Heavenly Coffee"
- Website: chockfullonuts.com

Chock full o'Nuts is an American brand that is used for a chain of coffee shops that originated from New York City and a retail line of coffee that originated from that chain.

Its unusual name derives from the 18 nut shops that founder William Black (c. 1902–1983) established with the brand in the city beginning in 1926. When the Great Depression struck, he converted them to lunch counters, serving a cup of coffee and a sandwich for five cents.

The brand became popular over the next 27 years and was introduced to the consumer market through grocery stores in 1953. It is owned by Italian coffee company Massimo Zanetti Beverage Group.

== History ==
The chain was founded by William Black (né Schwartz), who sold nuts in Times Square to theater-goers. In 1926, he opened a store at Broadway and 43rd Street, eventually adding 17 more. When the Depression began New Yorkers could no longer afford the luxury of shelled nuts, so Black converted the shops into lunch counters, selling coffee and sandwiches.

The company's signature "nutted cheese" sandwich, made of cream cheese and chopped nuts on dark raisin bread, cost a nickel with a cup of coffee when the company was founded. When coffee prices went up in the 1950s, Black, like other restaurateurs, held to a five cent cup of coffee by watering it down. But soon he broke ranks and raised the price, announcing that he refused to compromise on quality. In 1953, the coffee brand was introduced to supermarkets. Several years later baseball star Jackie Robinson became the company's vice president and director of personnel, after retiring from the game (the chain was already known for regularly hiring black employees in its lunch counters as both cooks and waitstaff).

In 1961, Chock full o'Nuts introduced a brand of instant coffee. Within the decade the chain had approximately 80 restaurants in New York City. A selling point was hygiene and the sandwiches advertised as "untouched by human hands". Cooks used tongs to assemble them.

In 1974, Chock full o'Nuts purchased Rheingold Brewery. In the 1970s, the lunch counters gradually closed. After Black died, the company sold its remaining 17 restaurants to the restaurant company Riese Bros. In 1988, investor Martin D. Gruss and the companies he controlled purchased a ten percent stake in the Chock full o'Nuts Corporation, saying he might seek control of the company. In 1993, Chock Express stores were introduced.

The Sara Lee Corporation purchased Chock full o'Nuts for $238 million in 1999. In May 2006, it was purchased from Sara Lee by Massimo Zanetti Beverage USA along with the MJB, Hills Bros., and Chase & Sanborn coffee brands.

On September 10, 2010, the company announced it was returning to the lunch counter business by opening its first store in almost 30 years, on West 23rd Street between Broadway and 6th Avenue in Manhattan. The company said it planned to add stores and kiosks in New York City serving the "nutted cheese" sandwich and other traditional Chock full o'Nuts menu items (plus new choices). Corey Torjesen of Staten Island, New York was the youngest franchise owner during the years after the comeback; he opened a Chock full o'Nuts franchise, at the age of 19, with money he had earned from a newspaper route. The 23rd Street store closed in 2012. As of 2019, six stores branded as Chock full o'Nuts Cafés were in operation, including one each in Elizabeth and Fort Lee, New Jersey; Middletown, New York; and Miami.. Locations in Brooklyn are also open.

To assure those with allergies to nuts, the company began adding the slogan "NO NUTS! 100% Coffee" to its packaging in the 2000s (the coffee blend itself has never contained nuts).

== Marketing ==
=== Jingle ===
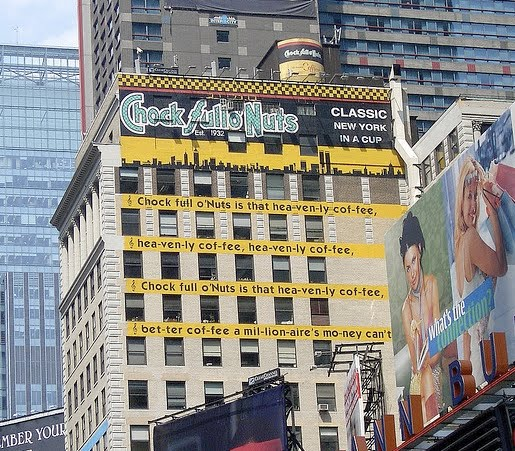
The Chock full o'Nuts advertising jingle on a building in New York City. Note the altered lyrics.

The Chock full o'Nuts advertising jingle was based on the song, "That Heavenly Feeling", written by Bernie Wayne and Bill Silbert. It was sung by company founder William Black's wife, cabaret singer Page Morton Black; it received extensive airplay on both radio and television in the 1950s and 1960s. The original lyrics:

Chock full o'Nuts is that heavenly coffee,
Heavenly coffee, heavenly coffee.
Chock full o'Nuts is that heavenly coffee,
Better coffee Rockefeller's money can't buy.

The company was compelled to alter the lyrics from "Rockefeller's money" to "a millionaire's money" after being sued by New York governor Nelson Rockefeller, who owned coffee interests in Latin America. Mid-2000s versions of the jingle replace "millionaire" with "billionaire".

== Use in film ==
In the 1976 film Marathon Man, the Dustin Hoffman character gets into his girlfriend's car across from the Chock full o'Nuts restaurant at 50th and Broadway in Manhattan.

Chock full o'Nuts features as a derelict location in John Carpenter's 1981 film Escape from New York.

Several large Chock full o'Nuts coffee cans can be seen in the galley of the USS Stingray in the 1996 film Down Periscope.

Chock full o'Nuts coffee cans are a plot element in the 2007 film The Bucket List.

In the film George of the Jungle, the title character eats coffee from a can after seeing an ad.
