= Sabrina Cinili =

Italian basketball player

No. 23 – Virtus Bologna
- Position: Point guard
- League: LegA

Personal information
- Born: 22 April 1989 (age 37) Rome, Italy
- Listed height: 6 ft 3 in (1.91 m)

Sabrina Cinili (born 22 April 1989) is an Italian basketball player for Virtus Bologna and the Italian national team.

She participated in the EuroBasket Women 2017.
