= Luca Baraldi =

Italian sports executive

- Born: 7 September 1960 (age 65); Modena, Italy
- Occupation: Executive
- Board member of: Parma Calcio 1913 (CEO, 2001–2003); S.S. Lazio (CEO, 2003); Parma Calcio 1913 (Vice President, 2003–2005); Modena F.C. (President, 2006–2007); Bologna F.C. 1909 (General manager, 2009); Calcio Padova (Counselor, 2012–2013); Virtus Bologna (CEO, 2019–2025)

Luca Baraldi (born 7 September 1960) is an Italian sports executive and director. During his long-time career, he worked both in basketball with Virtus Bologna and in football for Parma, Lazio, Modena, Bologna and Padova.

== Biography ==
Luca Baraldi was born in Modena, Emilia-Romagna, in 1960.

His professional career as a sports executive began in 2001, when the entrepreneur Calisto Tanzi, owner of Parmalat and Parma football team, convinced Baraldi to leave his career as a bank director for Banca Monte Parma and to enter the board of directors of Parma and Parmatour, and CEO of the football team for two years.

On 8 January 2003, he became CEO of S.S. Lazio, strongly supported by Cesare Geronzi, president of Capitalia, the bank controlling the Roman club. His task was to settle the accounts of the club, which has fallen into a serious financial crisis due to the collapse of Sergio Cragnotti's Cirio. Gradually, Baraldi's powers grew so that he also assumed the position of general manager. In this role he implemented the so-called Baraldi Plan, with the aim of reducing the enormous corporate deficit, consisting of the spreading of the players' salaries and in the transformation of part of their salaries into company shares. Baraldi's tenure at Lazio was quite short and in October 2003 he resigned, citing family needs as unspecified reasons.

In January 2004, he returned to Parma, where he became vice president and board member, but on 25 June 2005, he once again left the Emilian club. On 30 August 2006, he was elected vice president of the Serie B and at the same time he was appointed first vice president, then sports director, and later president of Modena F.C. But even in these roles his experience did not last long and in July 2007 he became an external collaborator of Rugby Colorno. In November 2009, he was appointed general manager of Bologna F.C., and in the 2012–2013 season he joined the board of directors of Calcio Padova with the role of managing director. In July 2013, with the sale of Calcio Padova by Marcello Cestaro to Diego Penocchio, he left his position.

From January 2016 to January 2025, Baraldi hold the position of CEO of Segafredo Zanetti Grandi Eventi, a company that operationally supports the sponsorships of Segafredo Zanetti S.p.A. in the world of cycling and basketball.

In the summer of 2019, Baraldi became CEO of Virtus Bologna, a basketball team of which Segafredo's owner, Massimo Zanetti, is the majority shareholder and president. During his tenure as CEO, Virtus won its 16th national title in 2021, the EuroCup in 2022 and three Supercups. The club also returned to EuroLeague, the top-tier European competition, after 14 years. In January 2025, following disputes regarding the club's management, Zanetti removed Baraldi as CEO of Virtus, ending his 6 years-long tenure.

== Legal issues ==
In 2007, due to the Parmalat's bankruptcy, Baraldi was sentenced to three years in jail, banned from public offices for five years and from private corporate offices for ten, and forced to pay a fine of 250,000 euros. However, the Court of Appeal of Bologna later acquitted him of all charges, ruling that "the fact does not exist".

The federal sports prosecutor's office also investigated him on charges of making fictitious capital gains when he was a leading board member of Parma. The FIGC National Disciplinary Commission acquitted him of all charges, finding that, on the date of the disputed market transactions, Baraldi was not within the Emilian club, but was actually working for Lazio.
