= Elazığ İl Özel İdarespor =

Turkish women's basketball team

- Leagues: Super League; EuroCup Women
- Founded: 2010
- Arena: İl Özel İdare Sports Hall (capacity: 1,020)
- Location: Elazığ, Turkey
- Team colors: Claret and white
- Head coach: Hakan Acer

Elazığ İl Özel İdaresi Spor Kulübü is a Turkish women's basketball club based in Elazığ, Turkey. The club was founded in 2010 and currently competing in the Turkish Super League and EuroCup Women.

== History ==
Elazığ İl Özel İdarespor was founded in 2010 and started to compete in professional leagues in 2014. After four seasons in the Second League, the club started the 2018–19 season with the Federation Cup championship and finished the season with the play-off championship in the Second League and promoted to the Super League. In their first season, they finished the first half of the Super League in the 4th place and qualified to compete in the Turkish Cup. After the 2020 Elazığ earthquake, the club had to move to Ankara and played their home games in there until the league was canceled due to the COVID-19 pandemic. They finished the canceled league in 8th place and qualified for the EuroCup. In the 2020–21 season, the club competed in European competitions for the first time in their history. They reached the quarterfinals but lost to KSC Szekszárd.

== Current squad ==
Elazığ İl Özel İdare 2021–22 roster
Players
Coaches

Pos.	No.	Nat.	Name	Ht.	Wt.	Age
F	1	(Turkey)	Bakır, Aysel	1.78 m (5 ft 10 in)		30 – 1 March 1995
F	2	(Turkey)	Sönmez, Şuğranur	1.83 m (6 ft 0 in)		23 – 3 April 2001
G	3	(United States)	Morgan, Kolby	1.73 m (5 ft 8 in)		28 – 15 July 1996
G	5	(Turkey)	Türk, Çelen	1.65 m (5 ft 5 in)		27 – 1 January 1998
G	8	(Turkey)	Güngör, Nazlı	1.68 m (5 ft 6 in)		29 – 5 June 1995
G/F	10	(United States)	Pulliam, Lindsey	1.78 m (5 ft 10 in)		25 – 6 August 1999
C	11	(Turkey)	Tokatlı, Gülfer	1.93 m (6 ft 4 in)		22 – 21 June 2002
F/C	14	(Turkey)	Yalçın, Nisa	1.90 m (6 ft 3 in)		24 – 19 January 2001
F	15	(Russia)	Razheva, Albina	1.90 m (6 ft 3 in)		30 – 14 November 1994
F/C	18	(Belarus)	Brych, Hanna	1.86 m (6 ft 1 in)		28 – 8 March 1997
G/F	23	(Turkey)	Dabakoğlu, Nihan	1.75 m (5 ft 9 in)		27 – 5 March 1998
F	35	(Turkey)	Yalçınkaya, Melike	1.89 m (6 ft 2 in)		31 – 1 September 1993

Head coach

- (Turkey) Hakan Acer

Assistant coach(es)

- (Turkey) Muhammet Ali Avcı

Legend

- (C) Team captain
- (DC) Dual citizenship
- Injured

- Roster
Updated: October 28, 2021

== Honours ==
=== European competitions ===
- EuroCup Women
  - Quarter finals: 2020–2021

=== Domestic competitions ===
- Second League
  - Play-off champion: 2018–2019
- Federation Cup
  - Champion: 2018–2019

== League performances ==
Season	League	Position	Played	Win	Loss	Coach
2014–2015	Second League: Group C	7th	14	2	12	(Turkey) Berat Gök
2015–2016	Second League: Group B	8th	22	8	14	(Turkey) Berat Gök
2015–2016	Second League: Play-off	Quarter finals	2	0	2	(Turkey) Berat Gök
2015–2016	Federation Cup	Group stage	2	0	2	(Turkey) Berat Gök
2016–2017	Second League	8th	38	22	16	(Turkey) Berat Gök
2016–2017	Second League: Play-off	Quarter finals	2	0	2	(Turkey) Berat Gök
2016–2017	Federation Cup	Group stage	4	2	2	(Turkey) Berat Gök
2017–2018	Second League	7th	31	19	12	(Turkey) Berat Gök (Turkey) Derya Özyer
2017–2018	Second League: Play-off	Quarter finals	3	1	2	(Turkey) Berat Gök (Turkey) Derya Özyer
2017–2018	Federation Cup	Group stage	5	2	3	(Turkey) Berat Gök (Turkey) Derya Özyer
2018–2019	Second League	2nd	30	24	6	(Turkey) Hakan Acer (Turkey) Güray Kurtuluş
2018–2019	Second League: Play-off	Champion	8	8	0	(Turkey) Hakan Acer (Turkey) Güray Kurtuluş
2018–2019	Federation Cup	Champion	6	5	1	(Turkey) Hakan Acer (Turkey) Güray Kurtuluş
2019–2020	Super League	8th	19	8	11	(Turkey) Olcay Orak
2019–2020	Turkish Cup	Quarter finals	1	0	1	(Turkey) Olcay Orak
2020–2021	Super League	11th	26	10	16	(Turkey) Olcay Orak (Turkey) Aziz Akkaya
2020–2021	EuroCup Women	Quarter finals	5	4	1	(Turkey) Olcay Orak (Turkey) Aziz Akkaya

== Notable players ==
United States

- Ariel Atkins (1 season: 2020)
- Chennedy Carter (1 season: 2020)
- Emma Cannon (1 season: 2020-2021)
- Jackie Young (1 season: 2020)
- Kelsey Mitchell (1 season: 2020-2021)
- Kia Vaughn (1 season: 2019-2020)
- Lauren Ervin (2 season: 2018-2020)
- Riquna Williams (1 season: 2019-2020)

Croatia

- Iva Slonjšak (1 season: 2019-2020)

Czech Republic

- Alena Hanušová (1 season: 2020)

Montenegro

- Jelena Dubljević (1 season: 2020-2021)

Slovenia

- Nika Barič (1 season: 2020-2021)
