= 2020–21 Women's Basketball Super League =

Women's Basketball Super League
- Season: 2020–21
- Dates: October 2020 – May 2021
- Games played: 182 + Playoff games
- Teams: 14
- TV partner(s): Tivibu

Regular season
- Relegated: Adana Basketbol; Canik Belediyespor

Finals
- Champions: Fenerbahçe (15th title)
- Runners-up: Galatasaray
- Semifinalists: Nesibe Aydın; Çankaya Üniversitesi
- Finals MVP: (United States) Kayla McBride (Fenerbahçe)

Statistical leaders
Points	(United States) Stephanie Madden	27.5
Rebounds	(United States) Emma Cannon	13.2
Assists	(Turkey) Özge Özışık	7.4
Efficiency	(United States) Emma Cannon	27.5

Records
- Biggest home win: Galatasaray 123–41 Canik (27 January 2021)
- Biggest away win: Canik 50–124 Çukurova (12 December 2020)
- Highest scoring: Hatay 109–108 Çankaya (18 February 2021)

Seasons
- ← 2019–20 2021–22 →

The 2020–21 Women's Basketball Super League (Turkish: Kadınlar Basketbol Süper Ligi) was the 41st edition of the top-tier level professional women's basketball league in Turkey.

The season is the first to be played after the previous season was abandoned due to the COVID-19 pandemic. The previous season was cancelled in May 2020.

== Teams ==
Locations of the 2020–21 Women's Basketball Super League clubs

	Team	Home city	Arena	Head coach
1	Adana Basketbol	Adana	Atatürk Sports Hall	(Turkey) Mehmet Özkan
2	Beşiktaş	Istanbul	BJK Akatlar Arena	(Turkey) Mehmet Kabaran
3	BOTAŞ	Ankara	DSİ Etlik Sports Hall	(Turkey) Zafer Kalaycıoğlu
4	Çankaya Üniversitesi	Ankara	Ankara Arena	(Turkey) Çağrı Özek
5	Çukurova Basketbol	Mersin	Servet Tazegül Arena	(Turkey) Olcay Orak
6	Elazığ İl Özel İdarespor	Elazığ	İl Özel İdare Spor Salonu	(Turkey) Aziz Akkaya
7	Fenerbahçe	Istanbul	Metro Enerji Sports Hall	(Spain) Víctor Lapeña
8	Galatasaray	Istanbul	Ahmet Cömert Sport Hall	(Turkey) Efe Güven
9	Hatay Büyükşehir Belediyespor	Hatay	Antakya Sports Hall	(Turkey) Ekin Baş
10	İzmit Belediyespor	Kocaeli	Atatürk Sports Hall	(Turkey) Fırat Okul
11	Kayseri Basketbol	Kayseri	Kadir Has Sport Hall	(Turkey) Ayhan Avcı
12	Nesibe Aydın	Ankara	TOBB ETÜ Sport Hall	(Turkey) Erman Okerman
13	Ormanspor	Ankara	Sait Zarifoğlu Sports Hall	(Turkey) Alper Durur
14	Samsun Canik Belediyespor	Samsun	Mustafa Dağıstanlı Sports Hall	(Turkey) Erdem Işık

== Regular season ==
=== League table ===
Pos	Team	Pld	W	L	PF	PA	PD	Pts	Qualification or relegation
1	Fenerbahçe	26	26	0	2236	1592	+644	52	Qualification to playoffs
2	Galatasaray	26	23	3	2180	1685	+495	49	Qualification to playoffs
3	Nesibe Aydın	26	19	7	1999	1777	+222	45	Qualification to playoffs
4	Ormanspor	26	16	10	2203	1902	+301	42	Qualification to playoffs
5	Çankaya Üniversitesi	26	15	11	2153	1991	+162	41	Qualification to playoffs
6	Çukurova Basketbol	26	14	12	2082	1954	+128	40	Qualification to playoffs
7	BOTAŞ	26	14	12	1796	1736	+60	40	Qualification to playoffs
8	Hatay Büyükşehir Belediyespor	26	13	13	2004	2019	−15	39	Qualification to playoffs
9	İzmit Belediyespor	26	11	15	1975	2007	−32	37	
10	Kayseri Basketbol	26	10	16	2067	2009	+58	36	
11	Elazığ İl Özel İdarespor	26	10	16	1943	2036	−93	36	
12	Beşiktaş	26	8	18	1977	2036	−59	34	
13	Adana Basketbol	26	2	24	1656	2242	−586	28	Relegation to TKBL
14	Samsun Canik Belediyespor	26	1	25	1397	2682	−1285	27	Relegation to TKBL

Source: TBF

=== Results ===
Home \ Away	ABK	BJK	BOT	ÇAN	ÇUK	ELA	FEN	GAL	HAT	İZB	KAY	NSB	ORM	SCA
Adana Basketbol	—	66–77	57–85	53–97	51–90	54–84	55–83	61–92	70–119	78–91	83–70	70–84	75–89	96–47
Beşiktaş	80–69	—	46–71	75–68	77–85	76–86	64–96	73–84	76–82	74–95	79–70	60–76	73–81	89–59
BOTAŞ	78–50	82–68	—	66–77	72–59	75–68	55–107	55–74	72–64	59–70	79–60	58–60	68–66	70–48
Çankaya Üniversitesi	75–59	98–94	80–75	—	93–61	78–67	71–86	66–65	91–59	86–64	86–75	67–76	69–71	121–63
Çukurova Basketbol	102–74	81–89	81–63	76–67	—	79–86	64–71	95–97	86–67	72–67	73–91	91–84	86–89	91–46
Elazığ İl Özel İdarespor	68–56	88–82	82–95	102–105	73–92	—	60–82	79–87	70–81	91–82	89–76	69–64	62–79	83–34
Fenerbahçe	106–71	84–76	79–51	90–55	79–55	72–48	—	64–61	92–62	101–64	91–69	91–85	88–85	110–54
Galatasaray	117–37	83–65	75–60	95–90	73–52	75–57	60–74	—	85–61	89–57	100–92	85–56	82–76	123–41
Hatay Büyükşehir Belediyespor	68–58	57–69	72–67	109–108	86–72	87–60	42–75	63–74	—	71–65	90–88	74–76	69–91	121–70
İzmit Belediyespor	100–59	74–68	57–72	64–72	58–60	103–64	52–96	62–80	96–97	—	84–72	70–75	91–89	113–47
Kayseri Basketbol	96–73	91–87	70–55	103–66	82–96	92–74	50–71	74–79	80–75	68–69	—	62–70	80–79	107–54
Nesibe Aydın	79–60	67–58	69–68	91–80	69–58	90–74	61–71	74–76	81–53	101–57	70–67	—	75–58	108–55
Ormanspor	86–66	94–90	60–64	88–68	100–101	92–77	64–72	56–67	91–63	107–68	87–63	88–58	—	120–65
Samsun Canik Belediyespor	79–55	49–112	37–81	64–119	50–124	48–82	58–105	45–102	56–112	59–102	50–119	57–100	62–117	—

Source: TBF
Legend: Blue = home team win; Red = away team win.

=== Statistical leaders ===
==== Efficiency ====
Pos	Player	Club	PIR
1	(United States) Emma Cannon	Elazığ İl Özel İdarespor	27.50
2	(United States) Ruthy Hebard	Nesibe Aydın	25.50
3	(Ukraine) Alina Iagupova	Fenerbahçe	25.45
4	(Croatia) Shavonte Zellous	Çankaya Üniversitesi	25.41
5	(United States) Stephanie Madden	Samsun Canik Belediyespor	25.32

==== Points ====
Pos	Player	Club	PPG
1	(United States) Stephanie Madden	Samsun Canik Belediyespor	27.47
2	(Croatia) Shavonte Zellous	Çankaya Üniversitesi	25.45
3	(United States) Emma Cannon	Elazığ İl Özel İdarespor	23.09
4	(Ukraine) Alina Iagupova	Fenerbahçe	23
5	(United States) Kayla McBride	Fenerbahçe	20.81

==== Rebounds ====
Pos	Player	Club	RPG
1	(United States) Emma Cannon	Elazığ İl Özel İdarespor	13.23
2	(United States) Stephanie Madden	Samsun Canik Belediyespor	13.05
3	(Montenegro) Angel Robinson	Ormanspor	12
4	(United States) Ruthy Hebard	Nesibe Aydın	11.77
5	(United States) Avery Warley-Talbert	Çankaya Üniversitesi	11.54

==== Assists ====
Pos	Player	Club	APG
1	(Ukraine) Alina Iagupova	Fenerbahçe	7.36
2	(Turkey) Özge Yavaş	Hatay Büyükşehir Belediyespor	7.21
3	(United States) Tyasha Harris	Kayseri Basketbol	6.62
4	(Turkey) Gökşen Fitik	Çukurova Basketbol	5.92
5	(United States) Shey Peddy	Nesibe Aydın	5.84

== Playoffs ==
Quarterfinals
1	Fenerbahçe	85	91	X
8	Hatay Büyükşehir Belediyespor	64	70	X
4	Ormanspor	68	74	X
5	Çankaya Üniversitesi	71	82	X
2	Galatasaray	64	67	X
7	BOTAŞ	51	50	X
3	Nesibe Aydın	76	79	X
6	Çukurova Basketbol	61	53	X

Semifinals
1	Fenerbahçe	86	83	60	X	X
5	Çankaya Üniversitesi	61	61	46	X	X
2	Galatasaray	68	70	81	58	70
3	Nesibe Aydın	71	68	73	68	58

Finals
1	Fenerbahçe	73	70	71
2	Galatasaray	66	57	56

=== Finals ===
6 May 2021	Fenerbahçe	73–66 (Series: 1-0)	Galatasaray	Istanbul
16:00 (UTC+3)	Scoring by quarter: 26-18, 8-10, 26-19, 13-19
	Pts: McBride 28; Rebs: Stokes 14; Asts: Iagupova, Stokes, Vaughn 4 PIR: McBride 30	Boxscore	Pts: Hollingsworth 16; Rebs: Šteinberga 9 Asts: Bilgiç 7 PIR: Hollingsworth 20	Arena: Metro Enerji Sports Hall; Referees: Sinan İşgüder, Erhan Gürsel, Göksun Öz

8 May 2021	Fenerbahçe	70–57 (Series: 2-0)	Galatasaray	Istanbul
16:00 (UTC+3)	Scoring by quarter: 18-14, 19-8, 21-13, 12-22
	Pts: Iagupova, McBride 22; Rebs: Stokes, Vaughn 10; Asts: Iagupova 7 PIR: Iagupova 23	Boxscore	Pts: Hollingsworth 14; Rebs: Hollingsworth 10; Asts: Bilgiç, Prince 3 PIR: Hollingsworth 20	Arena: Metro Enerji Sports Hall; Referees: Fatih Arslanoğlu, Yücel Çilingir, Kerem Yılmaz

11 May 2021	Galatasaray	56–71 (Series: 0-3)	Fenerbahçe	Istanbul
15:00 (UTC+3)	Scoring by quarter: 17-27, 11-12, 14-19, 14-13
	Pts: Hollingsworth 17; Rebs: Šteinberga 7 Asts: Prince, Šteinberga 4 PIR: Hollingsworth 19	Boxscore	Pts: McBride 23; Rebs: Stokes 18; Asts: Iagupova 7 PIR: Stokes 28	Arena: Sinan Erdem Dome; Referees: Mehmet Karabilecen, Aydın Karaçam, Tolga Edis
