= Mario Conte =

Italian politician (born 1979)

Mayor of Treviso
- Incumbent
- Assumed office 13 June 2018
- Preceded by: Giovanni Manildo

Personal details
- Born: 20 July 1979 (age 46) Treviso, Veneto, Italy
- Party: Lega Nord
- Height: 1.90 m (6 ft 3 in)
- Profession: Surveyor

Mario Conte (born 20 July 1979 in Treviso) is an Italian politician.

He is a member of the right-wing populist Lega Nord and he has served as Mayor of Treviso since 13 June 2018.

== See also ==
- 2018 Italian local elections
- List of mayors of Treviso
- Treviso

Political offices
Preceded by Giovanni Manildo	Mayor of Treviso since 2018	Succeeded by
