= Trek–Segafredo =

Trek–Segafredo may refer to:

- Trek–Segafredo (men's team), a professional cycling team that competes on the UCI World Tour
- Trek–Segafredo (women's team), a professional cycling team that competes on the UCI Women's World Tour.
