= List of mayors of Treviso =

Mayor of Treviso
- Sindaco di Treviso
- Incumbent; Mario Conte (LN) since 13 June 2018
- Appointer: Popular election
- Term length: 5 years, renewable once
- Formation: 1866
- Website: Official website

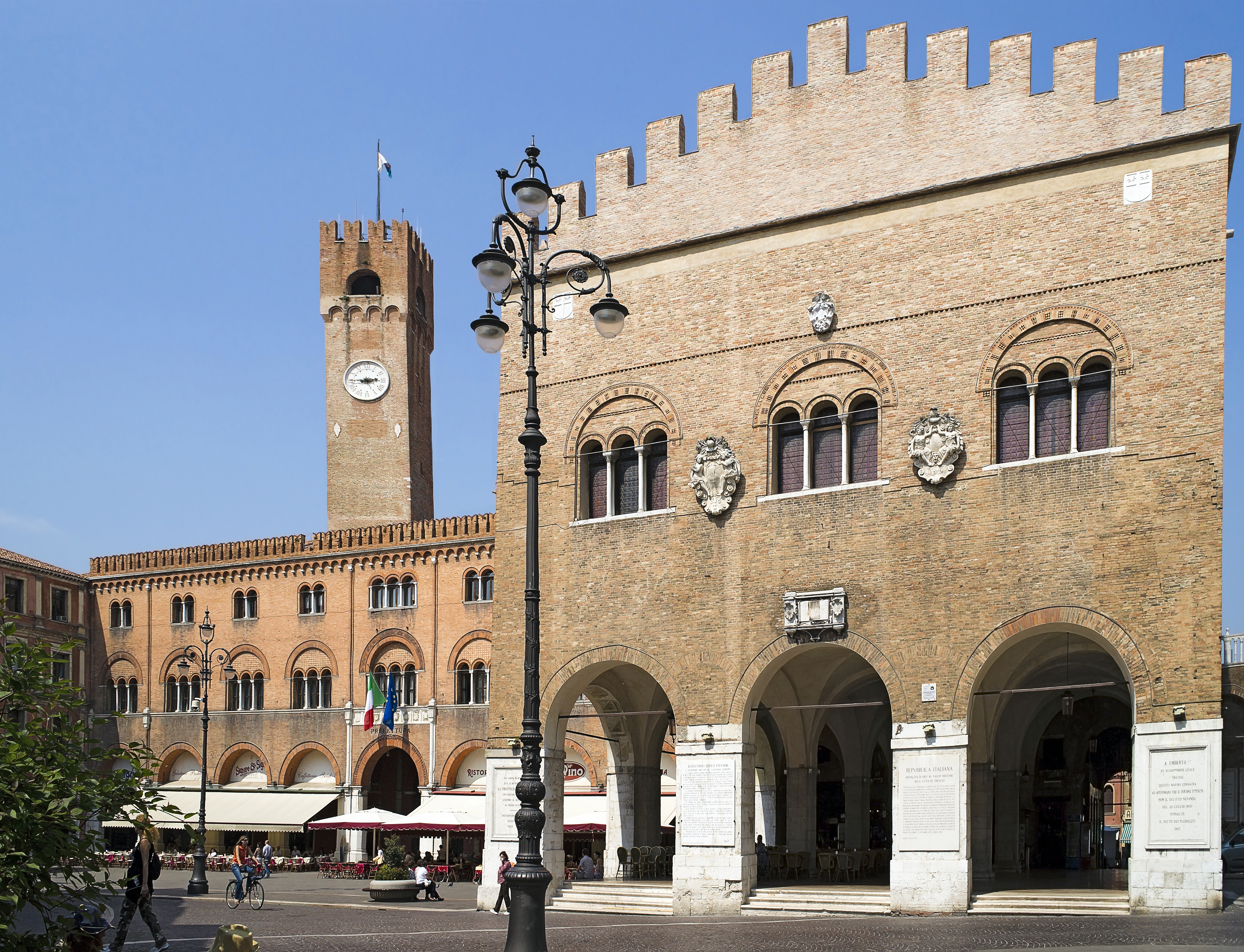
Treviso's City Hall.

The mayor of Treviso is an elected politician who, along with the Treviso's city council, is accountable for the strategic government of Treviso in Veneto, Italy.

The current mayor is Mario Conte, a member of the right-wing populist party Lega Nord, who took office on 13 June 2018.

== Overview ==
According to the Italian Constitution, the mayor of Treviso is member of the city council.

The mayor is elected by the population of Treviso, who also elects the members of the city council, controlling the mayor's policy guidelines and is able to enforce his resignation by a motion of no confidence. The mayor is entitled to appoint and release the members of his government.

Since 1994 the mayor is elected directly by Treviso's electorate: in all mayoral elections in Italy in cities with a population higher than 15,000 the voters express a direct choice for the mayor or an indirect choice voting for the party of the candidate's coalition. If no candidate receives at least 50% of votes, the top two candidates go to a second round after two weeks. The election of the City Council is based on a direct choice for the candidate with a preference vote: the candidate with the majority of the preferences is elected. The number of the seats for each party is determined proportionally.

== Italian Republic (since 1946) ==
=== City Council election (1946–1994) ===
From 1946 to 1994, the Mayor of Treviso was elected by the City Council.

	Mayor	Term start	Term end	Party
1	Antonio Ferrarese	18 April 1946	1 March 1948	DC
2	Giorgio Gregorj	1 March 1948	20 March 1948	DC
3	Raffaello Bettazzi	18 March 1948	18 June 1951	DC
(2)	Giorgio Gregorj	18 June 1951	19 May 1952	DC
4	Alessandro Tronconi	19 May 1952	3 March 1959	DC
5	Luigi Chiereghin	3 March 1959	25 January 1965	DC
6	Bruno Marton	25 January 1965	2 October 1975	DC
7	Antonio Mazzarolli	2 October 1975	10 March 1976	DC
8	Enrico Azzi	10 March 1976	27 November 1976	PRI
(7)	Antonio Mazzarolli	27 November 1976	22 June 1987	DC
9	Alessandro Reggiani	22 June 1987	11 July 1988	PSDI
10	Vittorio Pavan	11 July 1988	21 November 1992	DC
11	Gianfranco Gagliardi	21 November 1992	9 May 1994	DC
–	Special Prefectural Commissioner tenure (9 May 1994 – 5 December 1994)			

=== Direct election (since 1994) ===
Since 1994, under provisions of new local administration law, the Mayor of Treviso is chosen by direct election, originally every four then every five years.

	Mayor	Term start	Term end	Party	Coalition	Election
12	Giancarlo Gentilini	5 December 1994	14 December 1998	LN	LN	1994
12	Giancarlo Gentilini	14 December 1998	10 June 2003	LN	LN	1998
13	Gian Paolo Gobbo	10 June 2003	15 April 2008	LN	LN	2003
13	Gian Paolo Gobbo	15 April 2008	10 June 2013	LN	PdL • LN	2008
14	Giovanni Manildo	10 June 2013	13 June 2018	PD	PD • SEL	2013
15	Mario Conte	13 June 2018	6 June 2023	LN	LN • FI	2018
15	Mario Conte	6 June 2023	Incumbent	LN	LN • FdI • FI	2023
