= Emma Cannon =

American basketball player (born 1989)

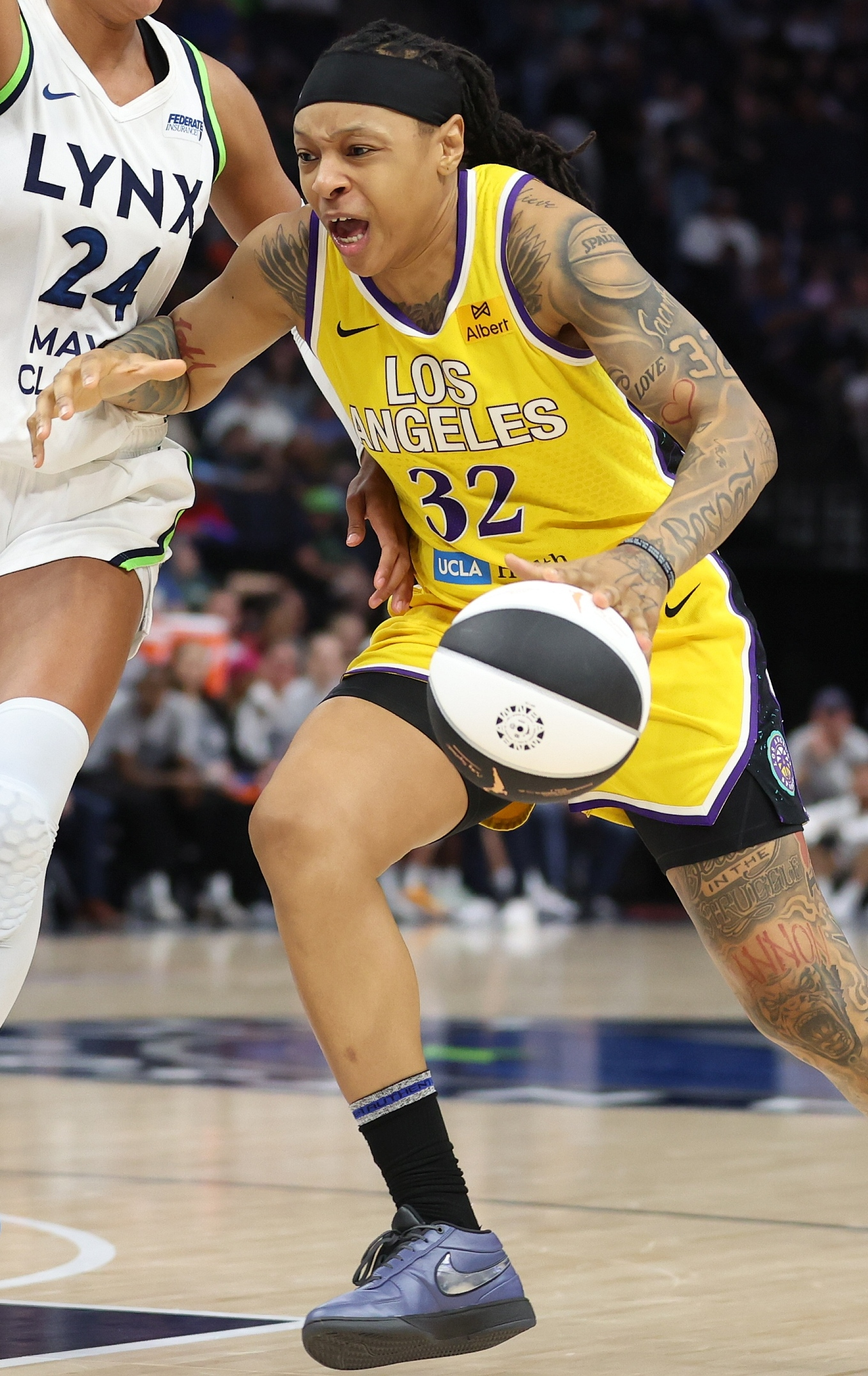
- Cannon with the Los Angeles Sparks in 2025

No. 32 – Los Angeles Sparks
- Position: Power forward
- League: WNBA

Personal information
- Born: June 1, 1989 (age 37) Rochester, New York, U.S.
- Listed height: 6 ft 2 in (1.88 m)
- Listed weight: 190 lb (86 kg)

Career information
- High school: School of the Arts (Rochester, New York)
- College: Central Florida (2007–2010); Florida Southern (2010–2011)
- WNBA draft: 2011: undrafted
- Playing career: 2011–present

Career history
- 2011–2012: Osnabrücker SC
- 2012: Rockingham Flames
- 2012–2015: TSV 1880 Wasserburg
- 2015–2016: Ramat HaSharon
- 2016–2017: Chevakata Vologda
- 2017: Phoenix Mercury
- 2017–2018: Nadezhda Orenburg
- 2018–2019: Arka Gdynia
- 2019–2020: NKE-FCSM Csata
- 2020–2021: Las Vegas Aces
- 2020–2021: Elazığ İl Özel İdarespor
- 2021: Connecticut Sun
- 2021: Indiana Fever
- 2021–2022: Elitzur Ramla
- 2022: Phoenix Mercury
- 2022–2023: Indiana Fever
- 2022: Bursa BSB
- 2022–2023: Elitzur Ramla
- 2023–2024: Nesibe Aydin Ankara
- 2024: Las Vegas Aces
- 2024: CCC Polkowice
- 2025: Henan Phoenix
- 2025–present: Los Angeles Sparks

Career highlights
- 2× Israeli League champion (2022, 2023); 3× German DBBL champion (2013–2015); 2× German Cup winner (2014, 2015); SBL Most Valuable Player (2012); SBL All-Star Five (2012); First-team All-C-USA (2009); Third-team All-C-USA (2010); C-USA tournament MVP (2009); C-USA All-Freshman Team (2008)
- Stats at Basketball Reference

Emma Cannon (born June 1, 1989) is an American professional basketball player for the Los Angeles Sparks of the Women's National Basketball Association (WNBA). She played college basketball for Central Florida and Florida Southern before debuting in the WNBA in 2017 for the Phoenix Mercury. She has also played for the Connecticut Sun, Indiana Fever and Las Vegas Aces and has played overseas in Germany, Australia, Israel, Russia, Poland, Hungary, Turkey, and China. She won two championships with Elitzur Ramla of the Israeli League in 2022 and 2023.

== Early life ==
Cannon attended the School of the Arts in Rochester, New York. While at the School of the Arts, Cannon collected 1,800 points and also 1,800 rebounds. She also holds the school record for both most points (47) and rebounds (35) in a single game. Following her outstanding high school career, Cannon committed to play collegiate basketball at Central Florida.

== College ==
=== Central Florida ===
During Cannon's freshman year, she was named to the C-USA All-Freshman team after averaging 11.7 ppg and 8.7 rpg. She continued her impressive play the following year, being named to the C-USA 1st Team. She broke the school record for rebounds in a season with 393. She was also named the C-USA Tournament MVP leading the Knights to the NCAA Tournament. Her junior year, she joined the 1,000 point club for the Knights and continued to move up both the points and rebound list for both the school and C-USA. Following her outstanding high school career, Cannon committed to play collegiate basketball at Central Florida.

=== Florida Southern ===
Cannon transferred to Florida Southern for her senior year and continued her individual and team success. She helped guide the Mocs to a 26–5 record and a trip to the Regional Final - finishing as the Runner-Up. She scored 15.7 ppg and 12.1 rpg. She was named an NCAA Division-II All-American Honorable Mention, as well.

== Professional career ==
=== WNBA ===
Cannon debuted in the Women's National Basketball Association (WNBA) in 2017 with the Phoenix Mercury. She played in all 34 regular season games that year, averaging 4.4 points and 3.6 rebounds while making 49.1 percent of her shots. She scored a career-high 17 points against the Dallas Wings on August 10 and had a career-high 10 rebounds against the Atlanta Dream on September 3. She re-signed with Mercury prior to training camp in 2018, but was waived before the start of the regular season. Likewise, in 2019, she signed with the Connecticut Sun, and was waived before the start of the season.

In September 2020, Cannon joined the Las Vegas Aces in the WNBA COVID bubble season in Florida, just prior to the team's playoff run to the WNBA Finals. In six postseason games, she connected on 50.0 percent of her field goal attempts, averaging 3.8 points and 2.2 rebounds.

Cannon re-signed with the Aces for the 2021 WNBA season. She played in three games before being waived on May 29, 2021. She signed with Connecticut on June 7, 2021. After being released by the Sun, Cannon signed with the Indiana Fever on July 28.

On April 16, 2022, Cannon re-signed with the Phoenix Mercury, but was released after playing in only one game. On June 5, 2022, Cannon returned to the Indiana Fever, playing in 23 games in 2022 and 30 games in the 2023 season.

In April 2024, Cannon signed a training camp contract with the Dallas Wings. Following their first preseason game, the Wings waived Cannon from their training camp roster. She subsequently returned to the Las Vegas Aces in May 2024. On June 16, 2024, she was waived by the Aces.

On February 2, 2025, Cannon signed with the Los Angeles Sparks for the 2025 WNBA season.

=== Overseas ===
Cannon has played for Osnabrücker SC in Germany (2011–12), Rockingham Flames in Australia (2012), TSV 1880 Wasserburg in Germany (2012–15), Ramat HaSharon in Israel (2015–16), Chevakata Vologda in Russia (2016–17), Nadezhda Orenburg in Russia (2017–18), Arka Gdynia in Poland (2018–19), NKE-FCSM Csata in Hungary (2019–20) and Elazığ İl Özel İdarespor in Turkey (2020–21). She joined Elitzur Ramla in Israel for the 2021–22 season. She started the 2022–23 season in Turkey with Bursa BSB before re-joining Elitzur Ramla in December 2022 for the rest of the season. She returned to Turkey for the 2023–24 season, where she played for Nesibe Aydin Ankara. She joined CCC Polkowice in Poland for the 2024–25 season but left in December 2024. In January 2025, she joined Henan Phoenix of the Women's Chinese Basketball Association.

== Career statistics ==
Legend
GP	Games played	GS	Games started	MPG	Minutes per game	FG%	Field goal percentage	3P%	3-point field goal percentage
FT%	Free throw percentage	RPG	Rebounds per game	APG	Assists per game	SPG	Steals per game	BPG	Blocks per game
TO	Turnovers per game	PPG	Points per game	**Bold**	Career high	°	League leader

=== WNBA ===
==== Regular season ====
WNBA regular season statistics
Year	Team	GP	GS	MPG	FG%	3P%	FT%	RPG	APG	SPG	BPG	TO	PPG
2017	Phoenix	**34**	0	12.9	.491	.000	.587	3.6	.3	.2	.2	.9	4.4
2018	Did not play (waived)												
2019	Did not play (waived)												
2020	Las Vegas	1	0	.4	—	—	—	.0	.0	.0	.0	**.0**	.0
2021	Las Vegas	3	0	5.7	.400	.000	**1.000**	1.7	.3	.0	**.3**	1.0	2.0
2021	Connecticut	5	0	11.6	.471	**.500**	.500	3.0	.8	.0	.2	1.0	4.2
2021	Indiana	12	**6**	**18.3**	.443	.214	.714	**4.5**	**1.0**	.4	.2	2.0	6.9
2022	Phoenix	1	0	6.0	**1.000**	—	.500	2.0	**1.0**	.0	.0	**.0**	3.0
2022	Indiana	23	2	14.3	.522	**.500**	.739	3.2	.5	**.6**	.1	.7	**7.0**
2023	Indiana	30	3	10.5	.455	.382	.909	3.1	.5	.1	.1	1.1	5.8
2024	Las Vegas	5	0	1.8	.667	.000	—	.4	.2	.0	.0	.2	.8
2025	Los Angeles	21	0	10.1	.508	.389	.652	1.8	.4	.5	.0	.8	4.4
2026	Los Angeles	18	2	7.6	.488	.480	.760	1.4	.3	.1	.1	.8	3.9
**Career**	8 years, 5 teams	153	13	11.4	.484	.393	.719	2.8	.5	.3	.1	.9	5.0

==== Playoffs ====
WNBA playoff statistics
Year	Team	GP	GS	MPG	FG%	3P%	FT%	RPG	APG	SPG	BPG	TO	PPG
2017	Phoenix	4	0	10.0	.286	—	—	**4.3**	.3	.0	.0	**.5**	1.0
2020	Las Vegas	**6**	0	**14.3**	**.500**	**.200**	.000	2.2	**.8**	.0	.0	1.7	**3.8**
**Career**	2 years, 2 teams	10	0	12.6	.448	.200	.000	3.0	.6	.0	.0	1.2	2.7

=== College ===
NCAA statistics
Year	Team	GP	GS	MPG	FG%	3P%	FT%	RPG	APG	SPG	BPG	TO	PPG
2007–08	UCF	30	0	25.7	.494	—	.649	8.7	**.9**	**1.3**	.8	**2.8**	11.7
2008–09	UCF	**34**	0	**30.9**	**.509**	—	**.783**	**11.6**	.4	1.2	**.9**	**2.8**	**15.5**
2009–10	UCF	25	**13**	26.8	.435	**1.000**	.655	10.0	.6	1.2	.8	3.0	11.0
**Career**		89	13	28.0	.486	1.000	.702	10.1	.6	1.2	.8	2.8	13.0
