= Hills Bros. Coffee =

American coffee manufacturer

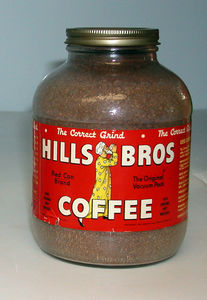
- WWII-era jar of Hills Bros. coffee with the original "taster" logo
- Current owner: Massimo Zanetti Beverage USA
- Country: United States
- Markets: Worldwide
- Previous owners: Nestlé; Sara Lee
- Website: http://www.hillsbros.com

Hills Bros. Coffee is a maker of packaged coffee, founded in San Francisco.

== History ==
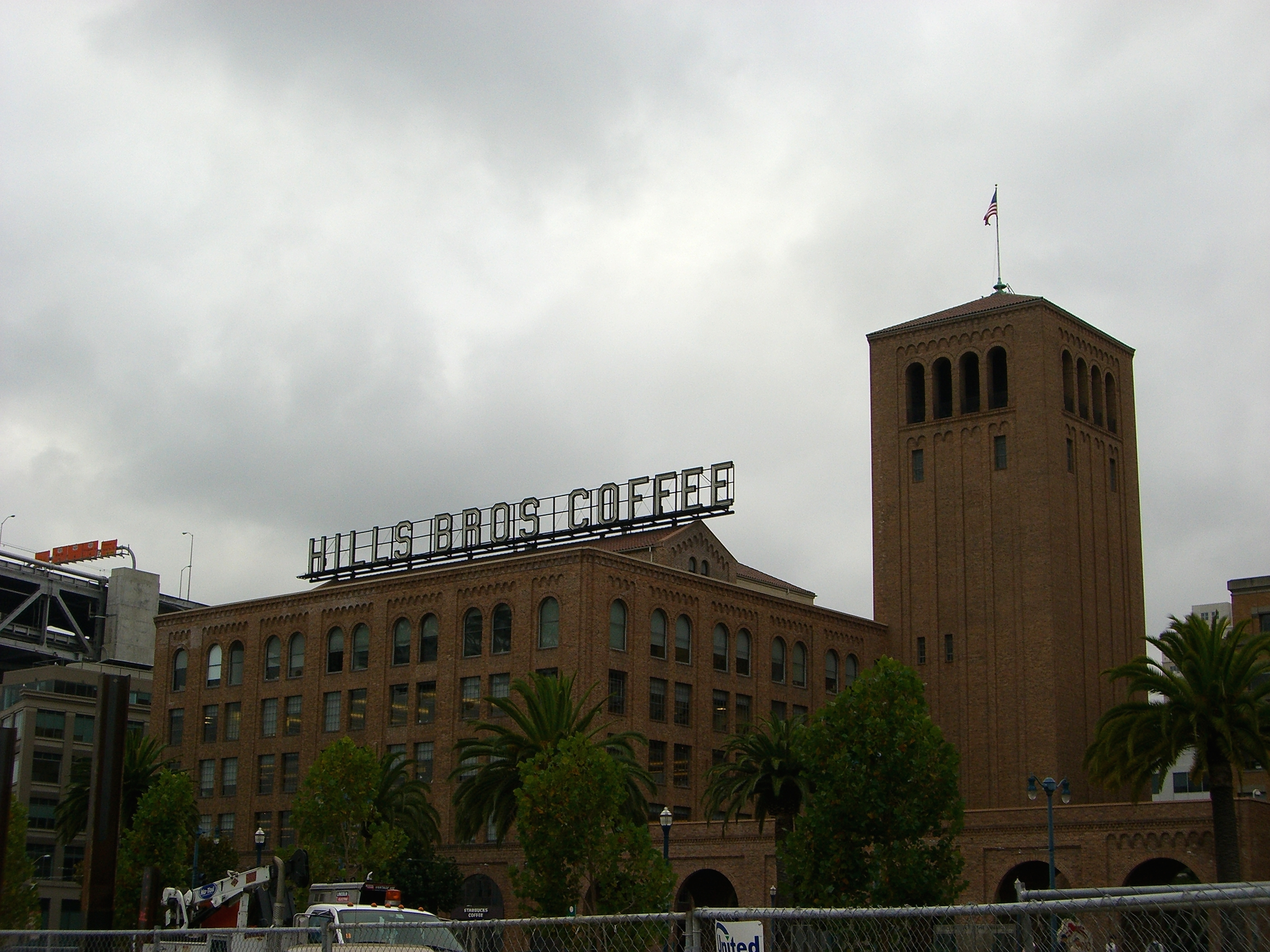
Hills Bros. Coffee building at 2 Harrison Street.

The company has its origins with the sons of shipbuilder Austin Hills (1823–1905), who was born in Rockland, Maine, and ran a business in California building clipper ships. His sons were Austin Herbert Hills (1851–1933), and Reuben Wilmarth Hills I (1856–1934).

In 1898, Edward Norton, of New York, was granted a United States patent on a vacuum process for canning foods, subsequently applied to coffee. Others followed. Hills Brothers, of San Francisco, were the first to pack coffee in a vacuum, under the Norton patents, in 1900.

In 1900, Hills Bros. were the first to pack roast coffee in vacuum sealed cans. They incorporated under the Hills Bros. name in 1906. In 1926 Hills Bros. moved its operations to 2 Harrison Street in San Francisco, a Romanesque revival building on the Embarcadero designed by George W. Kelham that is now a city landmark. The roasting operations once made the surrounding area smell like coffee, according to a Key System "March of Progress" style public service film from 1945. In January 2012, the building had become home to Wharton | San Francisco, a satellite campus of the Wharton School of the University of Pennsylvania. A Wharton sign can be currently seen on the Embarcadero side of the building. Google LLC and the Mozilla Corporation also have offices on several floors of the building.

A symbol of an Arab drinking coffee called "the taster", introduced in 1898, was designed by an artist named Briggs in 1906 but was replaced by a new, European-American, "taster" to represent the original founders in 1990. In 1976, Hills Brothers hired American singer Sergio Franchi as their TV spokesperson to introduce several lines of specialty flavors. Noted character actor John Zaremba was the primary commercial spokesperson for Hills Brothers in the 1970s and early 1980s, portraying a fictional coffee bean buyer.

In 1930 Hills Bros. expanded into Chicago. On 2 November 1938, Hills Brothers Coffee Company filed a petition to rezone 37 ½ acres for industrial purposes to build a plant in Elmhurst, Illinois, north of the North Western tracks to where Schiller Street extended beyond Geneva Avenue. Opposition caused Hills to drop its request.

During World War II, the company's metal containers were replaced with glass jars. In 1984 they purchased the name and manufacturing facilities of the Chase & Sanborn Coffee Company.

In 1976, the company was acquired from the family by a Brazilian corporation, Copersucar. In 1985 Nestlé bought Hills Bros. and MJB coffee companies. Hills Bros. opened a new roasting plant in Suffolk, Virginia in 1988. The San Francisco headquarters were closed in 1997, moving operations to Nestlé's U.S. headquarters in Glendale, California. Nestlé sold Hills Bros. to Sara Lee in 1999. Massimo Zanetti Beverage USA purchased the brand in 2006. Massimo Zanetti Beverage USA is headquartered at the Suffolk plant. Austin E. Hills was, formerly, chairman of the board of directors.

== See also ==
- Grgich Hills Estate, winery (business partners: Mike Grgich and Austin Hills)
- MJB (coffee), a San Francisco-founded brand of coffee
- Folgers, a San Francisco-founded brand of coffee
