= 2020–21 WPBL season =

Russian Women's Basketball Premier League
- League: Russian Women's Basketball Premier League
- Season: 2020–21
- Duration: 6 October 2020 – 11 March 2021 (Regular season); 21 March – 27 April 2021 (Playoffs)
- Teams: 10

Regular season
- Season MVP: (United States) Breanna Stewart

Finals
- Champions: UMMC Ekaterinburg (15th title)
- Runners-up: Dynamo Kursk

Records
- Biggest home win: UMMC 122–41 Dynamo Moscow (10 January 2021)
- Biggest away win: Spartak Noginsk 46–118 UMMC (19 October 2020)
- Highest scoring: MBA Moscow 97–103 Enisey Krasnoyarsk (7 October 2020)
- Winning streak: 25 games UMMC Ekaterinburg
- Losing streak: 15 games Spartak Noginsk

The 2020–21 WPBL season was the 30th season of the Russian Women's Basketball Premier League. UMMC Ekaterinburg are the defending champions.

== Regular season ==
Pos	Team	Pld	W	L	PF	PA	PD	Pts	Qualification
1	UMMC Ekaterinburg	18	18	0	1750	942	+808	36	Playoffs
2	Dynamo Kursk	18	14	4	1548	1212	+336	32	Playoffs
3	MBA Moscow	18	13	5	1353	1232	+121	31	Playoffs
4	Nadezhda Orenburg	18	13	5	1249	1160	+89	31	Playoffs
5	NIKA Syktyvkar	18	8	10	1241	1299	−58	26	Playoffs
6	Dynamo Novosibirsk	18	8	10	1220	1284	−64	26	Playoffs
7	Enisey Krasnoyarsk	18	7	11	1349	1452	−103	25	Playoffs
8	Sparta & K Vidnoye	18	7	11	1289	1361	−72	25	Playoffs
9	Spartak Noginsk	18	1	17	1006	1532	−526	19	
10	Dynamo Moscow	18	1	17	1031	1562	−531	19	

Source: RBF

== Playoffs ==
Quarterfinals
1 UMMC Ekaterinburg	85	103
8 Sparta & K Vidnoye	74	48
4 Nadezhda Orenburg	66	80	59
5 NIKA Syktyvkar	72	64	60
2 Dynamo Kursk	81	93
7 Enisey Krasnoyarsk	71	59
3 MBA Moscow	76	87
6 Dynamo Novosibirsk	66	58

Semifinals
1 UMMC Ekaterinburg	95	95
5 NIKA Syktyvkar	72	49
2 Dynamo Kursk	106	84
3 MBA Moscow	81	69

Final
1 UMMC Ekaterinburg	89	90	90
2 Dynamo Kursk	81	73	71
Third place
3 MBA Moscow	73	82	68
5 NIKA Syktyvkar	67	73	58

== Russian clubs in European competitions ==
Club	Competition	Progress
UMMC Ekaterinburg	EuroLeague	Champions
Dynamo Kursk	EuroLeague	Quarterfinals
Nadezhda Orenburg	EuroLeague	Regular season
Sparta & K	EuroCup	Round of 16
MBA Moscow	EuroCup	Regular season
