= Massimo Zanetti Beverage Group =

Italian coffee company

- Type: Private
- Industry: Coffee
- Founded: 1973
- Headquarters: Bologna, Italy
- Products: Coffee
- Owner: Massimo Zanetti
- Website: www.mzb-group.com

Massimo Zanetti Beverage Group is an Italian coffee company that owns multiple brands. Massimo Zanetti developed the firm starting in the 1970s after he moved to Bologna and acquired a local company called Segafredo, a historic coffee producer with a fairly well known brand. With turnover of around US$1.2 billion per year, it claims to be the biggest private company in the coffee industry.

== The group ==
Today, the Bologna, Italy-based group sells 120,000 tons of coffee annually. The Massimo Zanetti Beverage Group owns more than 20 consumer brands worldwide, including Chock full o'Nuts, Chase & Sanborn, MJB, Hills Bros., Segafredo Zanetti, Meira Oy, Brodies and Tiktak; that span a variety of products from espresso and coffee to tea and spices.

Massimo Zanetti Beverage USA, with its headquarters in Portsmouth, Virginia, is a division of Massimo Zanetti Beverage Group, a privately held, vertically integrated organization that processes, trades, roasts, and distributes coffee throughout the world. Massimo Zanetti Beverage USA owns coffee roasting plants in Suffolk, Virginia and Moonachie, New Jersey, and a coffee farm on Kauaʻi. Kauai Coffee Company LLC, is part of Massimo Zanetti Beverage, USA, Inc., one of the nation's largest coffee roasters, and is a subsidiary of the Italian global coffee company Massimo Zanetti Beverage Group.

Additionally, Massimo Zanetti Beverage Group operates 11 roasting plants globally, has a worldwide distribution network of subsidiaries and authorised dealers in 100 countries; manufactures La San Marco professional bar equipment and espresso machines, and owns a network of over 600 Segafredo Zanetti Espresso cafés worldwide. In May 2014, Massimo Zanetti Beverage acquired Boncafe Group for $US85 million.

In January 2019 the group acquired the Australian The Bean Alliance (a network of brands focused on niches) and a month later the Portuguese Cafés Nandi, active in the food service. In October 2019 it took over one of the historical names of the paulista coffee, Cafe Pacaembu.

The parent company Massimo Zanetti Beverage Group SpA was listed on the Electronic Share Market managed and organized by Borsa Italiana SpA, STAR segment, from June 2015 to 15 February 2021.

On 29 September 2020, MZB Holding S.p.A., a company controlled by Massimo Zanetti through MZ Industries S.A. promoted a total voluntary takeover bid aimed at delisting Massimo Zanetti Beverage Group SpA which took place on 15 February 2021.

On the subject of sustainability, in 2022, Standard Ethics Aei assigned a below-average sustainability rating of 'E+' on a scale of F being the least sustainable to EEE being the most sustainable in the SE Food&Beverage Sustainability Italian Benchmark.

== Brands ==
Segafredo
- Chase & Sanborn
- Chock full o'Nuts
- Hills Bros. Coffee
- Kauai Coffee
- Kauai Coffee Pacific Horizon
- MJB
- Segafredo

== See also ==
- Single-serve coffee container
- List of Italian companies
