= Giovanni Manildo =

Italian politician (born 1969)

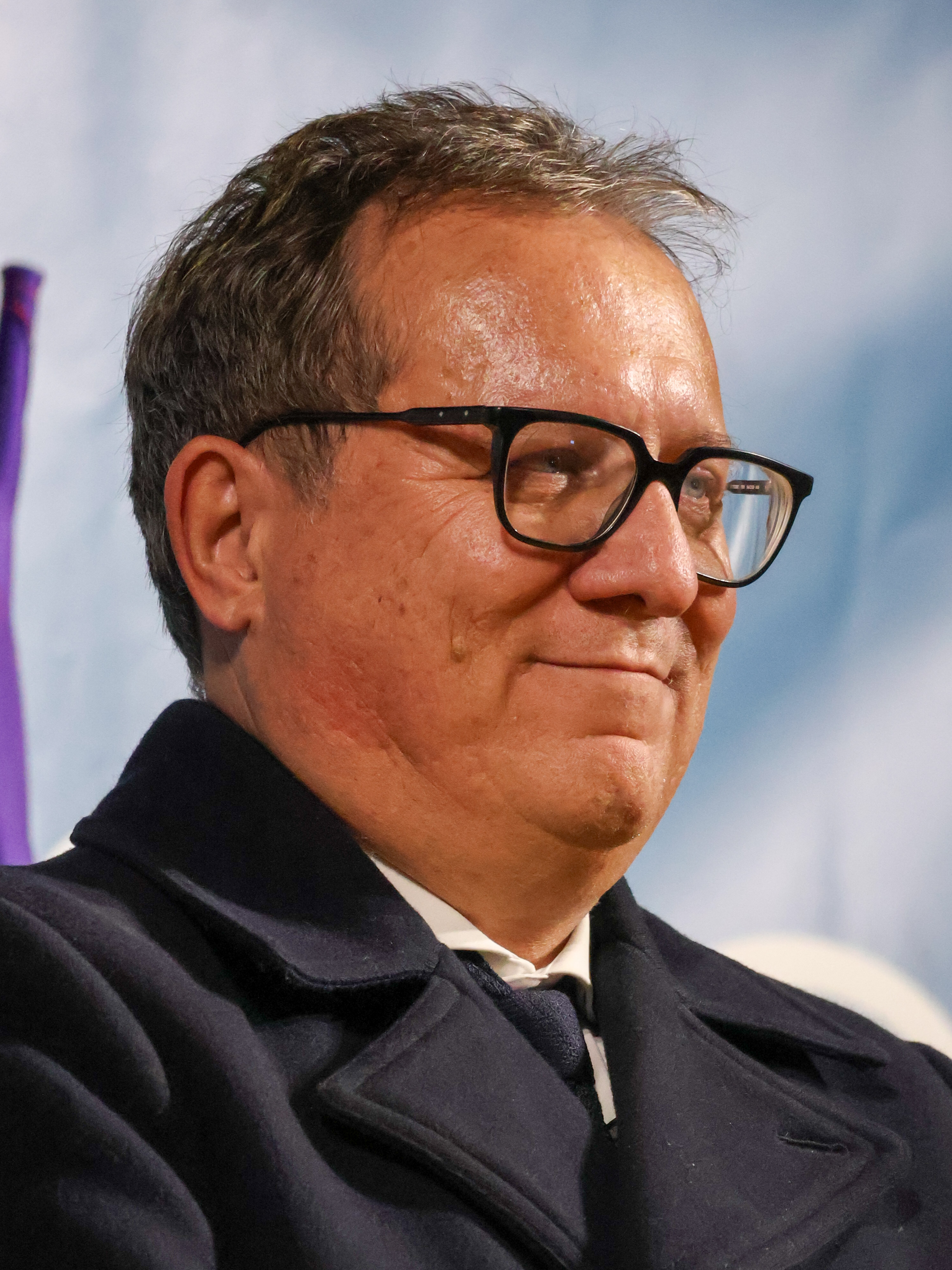

Member of the Regional Council of Veneto
- Incumbent
- Assumed office 2 December 2025
- Constituency: Treviso

Mayor of Treviso
- In office 10 June 2013 – 13 June 2018
- Preceded by: Gian Paolo Gobbo
- Succeeded by: Mario Conte

Personal details
- Born: 22 July 1969 (age 57) Conegliano, Italy
- Party: Democratic Party (since 2008)
- Education: University of Padua
- Profession: Lawyer

Giovanni Manildo (born 22 July 1969) is an Italian politician serving as a member of the Regional Council of Veneto since 2025. From 2013 to 2018, he served as mayor of Treviso. He was the candidate of the centre-left coalition for president of Veneto in the 2025 regional election.
