= Manolya Kurtulmuş =

Turkish basketball player

- Manolya Kurtulmuş

No. 3 – Fenerbahçe
- Position: Swingman
- League: Turkish Super League; EuroLeague Women

Personal information
- Born: 1 January 1998 (age 28) Turgutlu, Manisa, Turkey
- Listed height: 5 ft 9 in (1.75 m)

Career history
- 2013–2017: Alanya Belediyespor
- 2017–2018: Mersin Üniversitesi
- 2018–2020: Elazığ İl Özel İdarespor
- 2020: Kayseri Basketbol
- 2020–2021: Çukurova Basketbol
- 2021–2023: Fenerbahçe
- 2023–2024: Botaş
- 2024–2026: ÇBK Mersin
- 2026–present: Fenerbahçe

Career highlights
- EuroLeague champion (2023); FIBA Europe SuperCup Women champion (2026); EuroCup champion (2026); 2× Turkish Super League champion (2022, 2023); Turkish Cup: 2025

Manolya Kurtulmuş (born 1 January 1998) is a Turkish basketball player for Fenerbahçe and the Turkish national team.
