= 2022 Turkish Women's Basketball Cup =

- Season: 2021–22
- Duration: 22–26 March 2022
- Games played: 7
- Teams: 8

Finals
- Champions: Çukurova Basketbol
- Runners-up: Fenerbahçe Safiport

Awards
- Final MVP: (United Kingdom) Temi Fagbenle

The 2022 Turkish Women's Basketball Cup (Turkish: 2022 Kadınlar Basketbol Türkiye Kupası) was the 29th edition of Turkey's top-tier level professional women's domestic basketball cup competition. The tournament was held between 22 and 26 March 2022 at the Servet Tazegül Spor Salonu in Mersin.

== Qualified teams ==
The top eight placed teams after the first half of the 2021–22 Women's Basketball Super League qualified for the tournament. The four highest placed teams are going to play the lowest seeded teams in the quarter-finals. The competition was played under a single elimination format.

Pos	Team	Pld	W	L	PF	PA	PD	Pts	Seeding
1	Fenerbahçe Safiport	13	12	1	1152	773	+379	25	Seeded
2	Çukurova Basketbol	13	10	3	1032	850	+182	23	Seeded
3	Ormanspor	13	10	3	1040	895	+145	23	Seeded
4	Nesibe Aydın	13	10	3	997	881	+116	23	Seeded
5	Bursa Büyükşehir Belediyespor	13	9	4	943	934	+9	22	Unseeded
6	Galatasaray	13	7	6	854	799	+55	20	Unseeded
7	Botaş	13	6	7	907	897	+10	19	Unseeded
8	Hatayspor	13	6	7	1021	1074	−53	19	Unseeded

Source: TBF

== Bracket ==
Quarterfinals
1	Fenerbahçe Safiport	74
6	Galatasaray	68
4	Nesibe Aydın	91
5	Bursa BB	80
2	Çukurova Basketbol	81
8	Hatayspor	58
3	Ormanspor	85
7	Botaş	77

Semifinals
1	Fenerbahçe Safiport	74
4	Nesibe Aydın	66
2	Çukurova Basketbol	96
3	Ormanspor	93

Final
1	Fenerbahçe Safiport	58
2	Çukurova Basketbol	71

== Quarterfinals ==
22 March 2022	Nesibe Aydın	91–80	Bursa Büyükşehir Belediyespor	Mersin
16:30 (UTC+3)	Scoring by quarter: 23–29, 29–19, 22–21, 17–11
	Pts: Coates 22; Rebs: Coates 12; Asts: Thomas 7 PIR: Coates 35	Report	Pts: Macaulay 27; Rebs: Macaulay 9 Asts: Doyle 9 PIR: Macaulay 34	Arena: Servet Tazegül Spor Salonu; Referees: Ayşenur Yazıcıoğlu, İbrahim Altıntaş, Berk Kurtulmuş

22 March 2022	Fenerbahçe Safiport	74–68	Galatasaray	Mersin
19:30 (UTC+3)	Scoring by quarter: 22–24, 18–19, 17–10, 17–15
	Pts: Iagupova 18; Rebs: Canıtez 10; Asts: Iagupova 8 PIR: Iagupova 25	Report	Pts: Plum 24; Rebs: Krajišnik 11; Asts: Plum 7 PIR: Plum 28	Arena: Servet Tazegül Spor Salonu; Referees: Yener Yılmaz, Göksun Öz, Çağlar Özkan

23 March 2022	Ormanspor	85–77	Botaş	Mersin
17:00 (UTC+3)	Scoring by quarter: 28–21, 15–23, 21–17, 21–16
	Pts: McCowan 26; Rebs: McCowan 19; Asts: Uzun 7 PIR: McCowan 36	Report	Pts: Dubljević 28; Rebs: Şenyürek 11; Asts: Davis, Dubljević 4 PIR: Dubljević 35	Arena: Servet Tazegül Spor Salonu; Referees: Musa Kazım Çetin, Orkun Yurttaş, Çisil Güngör

23 March 2022	Çukurova Basketbol	81–58	Hatayspor	Mersin
19:30 (UTC+3)	Scoring by quarter: 24–19, 9–14, 29–14, 19–11
	Pts: Bonner 23; Rebs: Bonner 12; Asts: Thomas, Yalçın 6 PIR: Bonner 34	Report	Pts: Ellenberg, Jones 15; Rebs: Çağlar 9 Asts: Çağlar 3 PIR: Çağlar 13	Arena: Servet Tazegül Spor Salonu; Referees: Murat Ciner, Fatih Güler, İsmail Binbir

== Semifinals ==
24 March 2022	Fenerbahçe Safiport	74–66	Nesibe Aydın	Mersin
17:00 (UTC+3)	Scoring by quarter: 20–21, 17–12, 17–13, 20–20
	Pts: McBride 28; Rebs: Williams 12; Asts: Onar 6 PIR: McBride 30	Report	Pts: Coates, Nacickaitė 16; Rebs: Thomas 8 Asts: Thomas, Nacickaitė, Snytsina 4 PIR: Thomas 17	Arena: Servet Tazegül Spor Salonu; Referees: Murat Ciner, Orkun Yurttaş, Çisil Güngör

24 March 2022	Çukurova Basketbol	96–93	Ormanspor	Mersin
19:30 (UTC+3)	Scoring by quarter: 24–24, 26–19, 25–26, 21–24
	Pts: Bonner 24; Rebs: Bonner 6 Asts: Barič 7 PIR: Fagbenle 26	Report	Pts: McCowan 20; Rebs: McCowan 16; Asts: Robinson 7 PIR: McCowan 27	Arena: Servet Tazegül Spor Salonu; Referees: Yener Yılmaz, İbrahim Altıntaş, İsmail Binbir

== Final ==
26 March 2022	Fenerbahçe Safiport	58–71	Çukurova Basketbol	Mersin
15:00 (UTC+3)	Scoring by quarter: 16–23, 11–18, 18–17, 13–13
	Pts: Iagupova 15; Rebs: Williams 10; Asts: Iagupova 4 PIR: Williams 20	Report	Pts: Bonner 24; Rebs: Fagbenle 12; Asts: Yalçın 9 PIR: Fagbenle 33	Arena: Servet Tazegül Spor Salonu; Referees: Yener Yılmaz, Fatih Güler, Çağlar Özkan

== See also ==
- 2021–22 Super League
