= Sinem Ataş =

Turkish basketball player (2002)

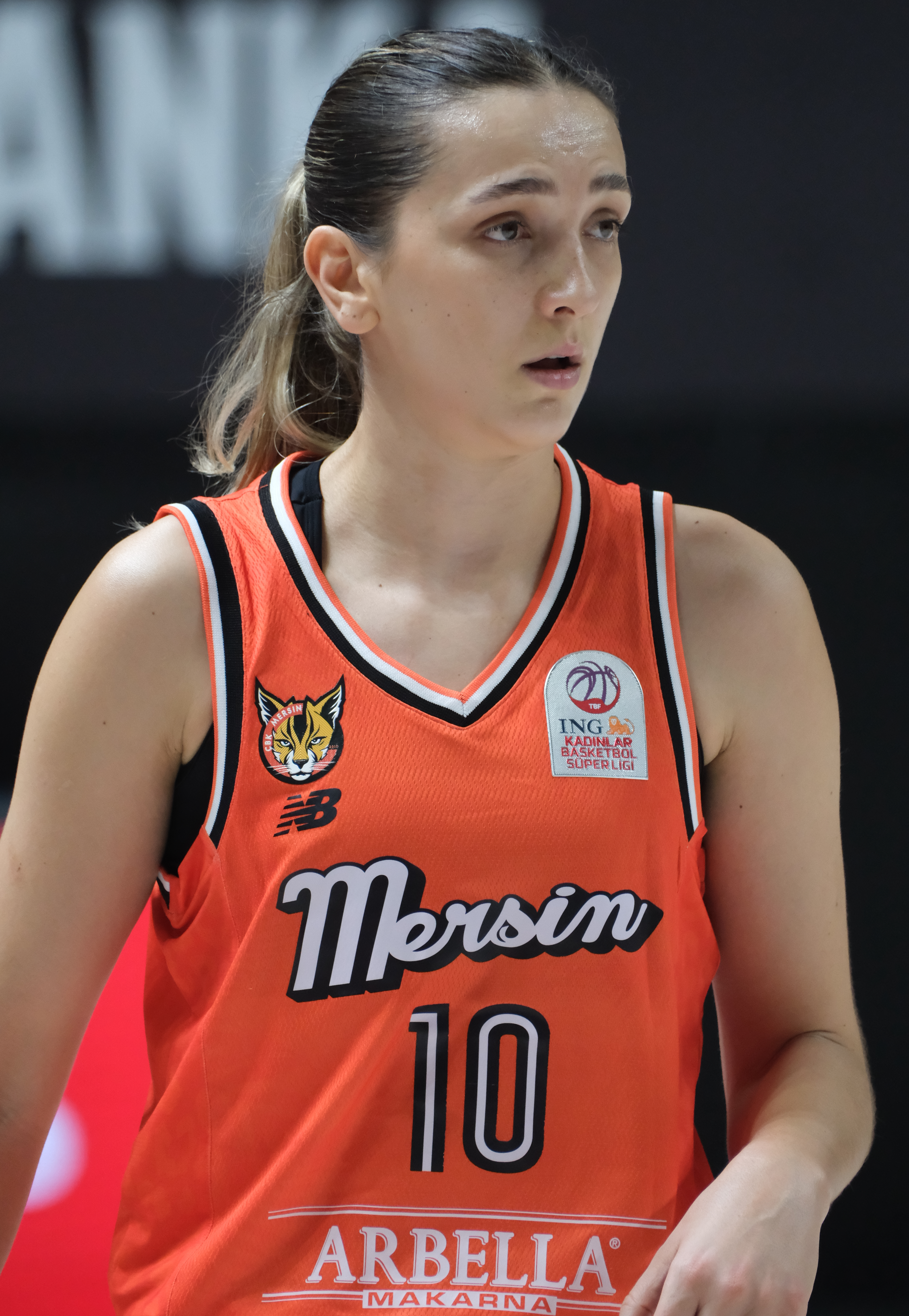

No. 10 – ÇBK Mersin
- Position: Small forward
- League: Turkish Super League; EuroLeague Women

Personal information
- Born: 1 January 1995 (age 31) Ayvalık, Turkey
- Listed height: 6 ft 1 in (1.85 m)

Career information
- Playing career: 2011–present

Career history
- 2011–2013: Antalya Koleji
- 2013–2017: Kayseri Basketbol
- 2014–2015: → Yakın Doğu Üniversitesi
- 2015–2016: → Osmaniye GSK
- 2017: Yakın Doğu Üniversitesi
- 2017–2018: ÇBK Mersin
- 2018–2020: Galatasaray
- 2020–2021: OGM Ormanspor
- 2021–present: ÇBK Mersin

Career highlights
- 2× EuroCup champion (2017, 2026); Turkish Super League champion (2017); 3× Turkish Cup champion (2017, 2022, 2025); Turkish Presidential Cup (2022)

Sinem Ataş (born 1 January 1995) is a Turkish basketball player for ÇBK Mersin of the Turkish Super League.

== Club career ==
On 15 July 2021, she rejoined the Turkish side ÇBK Mersin

== International career ==
She participated at the EuroBasket Women 2025.

== Honours ==
=== Club ===
==== Yakın Doğu Üniversitesi ====
- EuroCup Women: 2016–17
- Women's Basketball Super League: 2016–17
- Turkish Women's Basketball Cup: 2016–17

==== ÇBK Mersin ====
- EuroCup Women: 2026
- Turkish Women's Basketball Cup: 2022, 2025
- Turkish Women's Basketball Presidential Cup: 2022
