= Kennedy Burke =

American basketball player (born 1997)

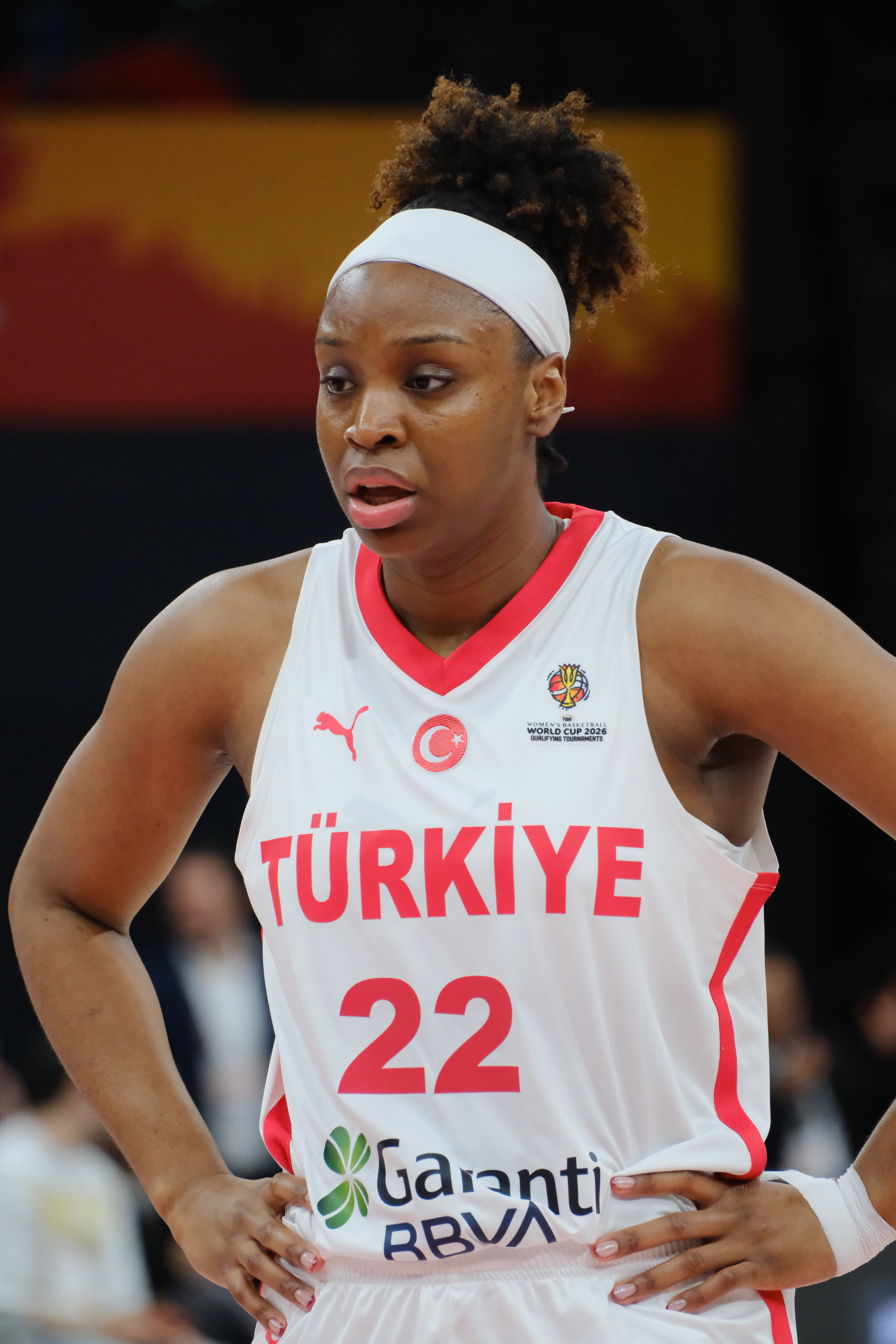
- Burke with the Türkiye in 2026

No. 25 – Houston Comets
- Position: Guard/Forward
- League: WNBA

Personal information
- Born: February 14, 1997 (age 29) Burbank, California, U.S.
- Listed height: 6 ft 1 in (1.85 m)
- Listed weight: 199 lb (90 kg)

Career information
- High school: Sierra Canyon School (Chatsworth, California)
- College: UCLA (2015–2019)
- WNBA draft: 2019: 2nd round, 22nd overall pick
- Drafted by: Dallas Wings
- Playing career: 2019–present

Career history
- 2019–2020: Indiana Fever
- 2021: Seattle Storm
- 2021–2022: Spar Girona
- 2022: Washington Mystics
- 2022–2024: Villeneuve-d'Ascq
- 2024–2025: New York Liberty
- 2024–2025: OGM Ormanspor
- 2025–present: ÇBK Mersin
- 2026: Connecticut Sun

Career highlights
- WNBA champion (2024); EuroCup champion (2026); Commissioner’s Cup Champion (2021); All-EuroLeague Second Team (2024); 2x LFB Most Valuable Player (2023, 2024); Pac-12 All-Defensive Team (2019); 3× Honorable Mention All-Pac-12 (2017–2019); Pac-12 All-Freshman Team (2016)
- Stats at Basketball Reference
Medals
Women's basketball
Representing the United States
FIBA Under-17 World Cup
Gold medal – first place	2014 Czech Republic	Team

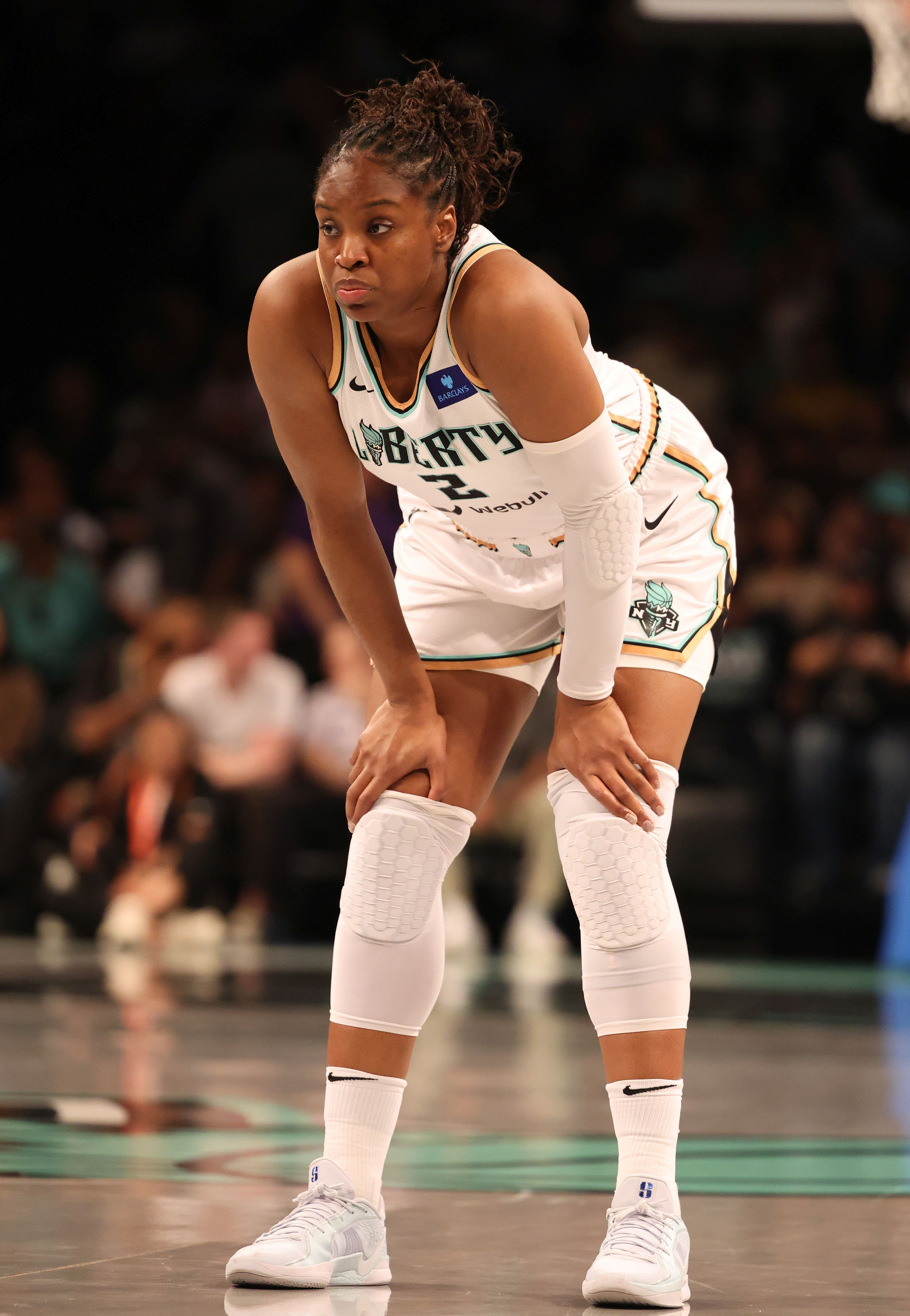
Burke with the New York Liberty in 2024

Kennedy Valentine Burke (born February 14, 1997), also known as Beren Burke, is an American-Turkish professional basketball player for the Houston Comets of the Women's National Basketball Association (WNBA) and for ÇBK Mersin of the Turkish Super League. She played college basketball for the UCLA Bruins. She was drafted by the Dallas Wings in the 2019 WNBA draft, and has played for the Indiana Fever, Seattle Storm, Washington Mystics, and the New York Liberty in the WNBA.

== Early life ==
Burke is from Northridge, Los Angeles. Her father played professional basketball in the Mexican league and competed for the Panamanian national team. Burke attended Sierra Canyon School in nearby Chatsworth. She has an older sister, Kody Burke, who played college basketball at NC State.

== Career ==
Burke played for UCLA in college. She was drafted No. 22 overall by the Dallas Wings in 2019.

In 2026 Burke signed as a free agent with the Connecticut Sun.

=== Overseas ===
Burke began her international career in Turkey, playing for Bellona Kayseri Basketbol in the Super League where she averaged 18 points and eight rebounds a game; Kayseri also played in the truncated 2020–21 EuroCup Women competition.

During the 2020–2021 season, Burke played for the Lega Basket Femminile team Dinamo Sassari in Italy. The following year she played for Spar Girona in the Spanish league; they competed in the 2021–22 EuroLeague Women season.

In 2022, Burke joined ESB Villeneuve-d'Ascq in France's Ligue Féminine de Basketball. She has become a breakout star in the league and was named its Most Valuable Player two years in a row (2023, 2024). The team played in the EuroCup and the 2023 EuroLeague Qualifying Round; for the 2023–2024 season, the team was promoted to the EuroLeague and were the runner-ups of the season. Burke was named All-EuroLeague Second Team and MVP of the Month in December, among other honors.

During the 2024–2025 season, Burke played for OGM Ormanspor of the Turkish Super League.

She signed with Çukurova Basketbol for the 2025–26 season.

== International career ==
In March 2026, Burke acquired Turkish citizenship, adopting the given name Beren and subsequently began playing for the Turkey women's national basketball team in the 2026 FIBA Women's Basketball World Cup Qualifying Tournaments.

== Career statistics ==
Legend
GP	Games played	GS	Games started	MPG	Minutes per game	RPG	Rebounds per game
APG	Assists per game	SPG	Steals per game	BPG	Blocks per game	PPG	Points per game
TO	Turnovers per game	FG%	Field-goal percentage	3P%	3-point field-goal percentage	FT%	Free-throw percentage
**Bold**	Career best	°	League leader

†	Denotes season(s) in which Burke won a WNBA championship

=== WNBA ===
==== Regular season ====
Stats current through end of 2026 season

WNBA regular season statistics
Year	Team	GP	GS	MPG	FG%	3P%	FT%	RPG	APG	SPG	BPG	TO	PPG
2019	Indiana	31	7	13.6	.385	.350	.705	1.5	0.7	0.6	0.3	0.7	4.4
2020	Indiana	22	11	18.3	.449	.313	.714	1.8	1.1	0.6	0.4	1.2	7.2
2021	Seattle	23	0	7.7	.446	.333	.625	0.8	0.3	0.3	0.1	**0.5**	2.9
2022	Washington	16	4	13.9	.446	.344	.588	2.2	0.4	1.0	0.3	**0.5**	5.4
2023	Did not appear in WNBA												
2024^{†}	New York	**38**	3	12.1	.409	.259	.667	1.5	0.9	0.6	0.3	0.7	3.4
2025	New York	36	9	21.6	**.468**	**.414**	**.759**	2.4	1.3	0.8	0.4	0.9	8.1
2026	Connecticut	37	**14**	**23.8**	.401	.324	.713	**3.2**	**1.4**	**1.2**	**0.8**	1.5	**8.8**
**Career**	7 years, 5 teams	203	48	16.5	.427	.341	.706	2.0	0.9	0.7	0.4	0.9	5.9

==== Playoffs ====
WNBA playoff statistics
Year	Team	GP	GS	MPG	FG%	3P%	FT%	RPG	APG	SPG	BPG	TO	PPG
2021	Seattle	1	0	5.0	—	—	—	**3.0**	0.0	0.0	0.0	1.0	0.0
2024^{†}	New York	**6**	0	7.5	.182	**.167**	.250	1.7	**0.5**	0.2	**0.2**	0.3	1.0
2025	New York	3	0	**17.3**	**.263**	.091	**.750**	2.3	0.3	**0.3**	**0.7**	2.0	**4.7**
**Career**	3 years, 2 teams	10	0	10.2	.233	.118	.500	2.0	0.4	0.2	0.3	0.9	2.0

=== College ===
NCAA statistics
Year	Team	GP	GS	MPG	FG%	3P%	FT%	RPG	APG	SPG	BPG	TO	PPG
2015–16	UCLA	**35**	0	18.5	.409	**.323**	.566	3.7	1.0	1.3	0.7	**1.4**	5.8
2016–17	UCLA	34	29	29.3	.457	.286	.663	4.9	1.9	1.9	**1.1**	2.1	12.2
2017–18	UCLA	**35**	**34**	29.5	.434	.296	.728	4.3	2.2	1.7	0.9	1.8	10.6
2018–19	UCLA	34	**34**	**32.7**	**.488**	.296	**.732**	**6.2**	**2.3**	**2.0**	0.9	2.3	**15.4**
**Career**		138	97	27.4	.454	.298	.690	4.8	1.9	1.7	0.9	1.9	11.0

== Awards and honors ==
=== Overseas ===
Ligue Féminine de Basketball

- 2x Most Valuable Player (2023, 2024)
- 2x Major 5 Trophy (2023, 2024)

EuroLeague Women

- All-EuroLeague Second Team (2024)
- 2x MVP of the Month (2023, 2025)
- 2x Team of the Month (2023–2024)
- 4x MVP of the Round (2023–2024)
