= Alina Iagupova =

Ukrainian basketball player

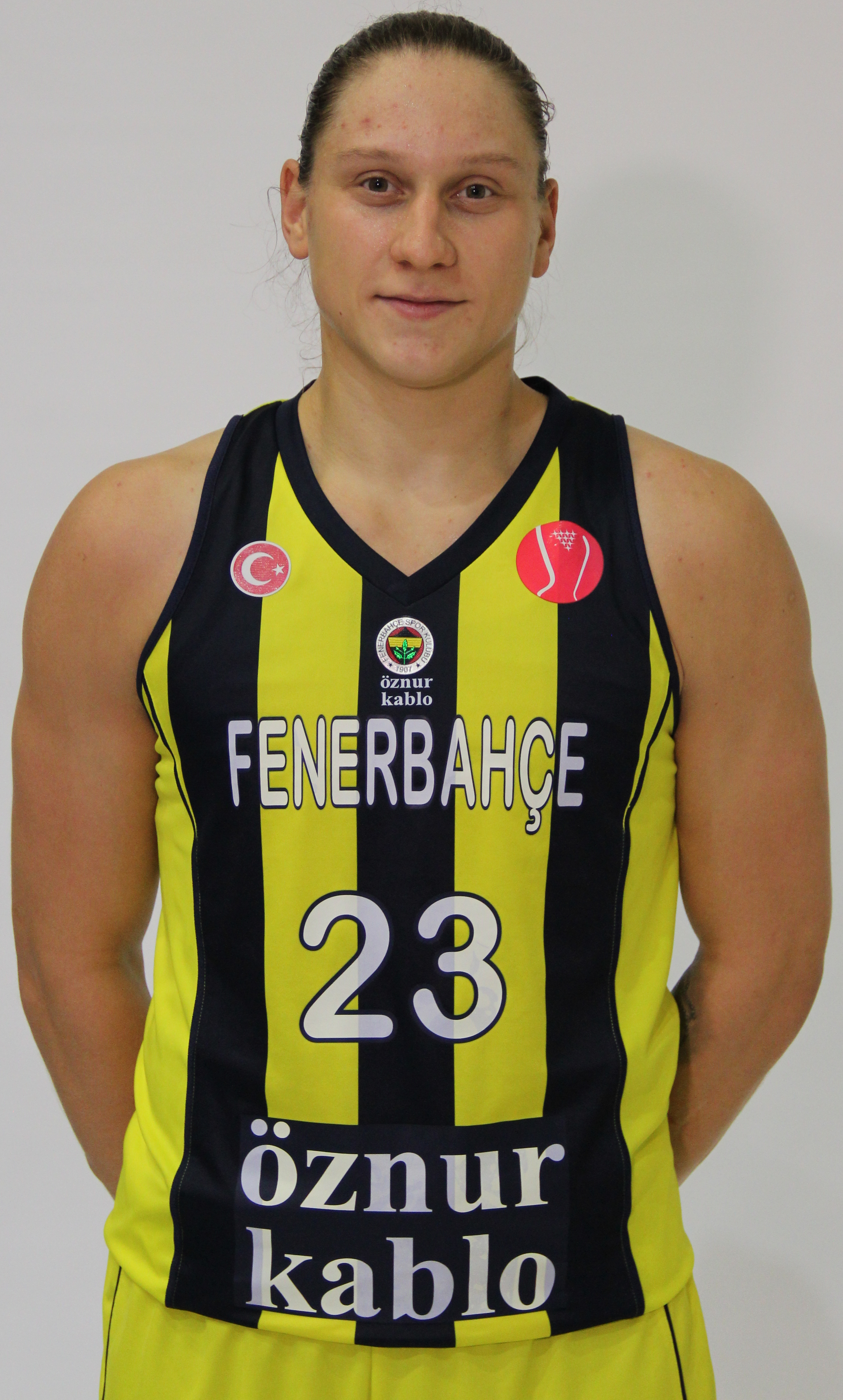
- Iagupova in 2019

No. 45 – ÇBK Mersin
- Position: Shooting guard
- League: First Women's Basketball League of Serbia; EuroCup Women

Personal information
- Born: February 9, 1992 (age 34) Dnipro, Ukraine
- Listed height: 6 ft 1 in (1.85 m)

Career information
- WNBA draft: 2013: 3rd round, 34th overall pick
- Drafted by: Los Angeles Sparks

Career history
- 2009–2011: Dnipro Dnipropetrovsk
- 2011–2012: Regina-Basket Bar
- 2012–2014: Elizabeth-Basket
- 2014–2015: Astana Tigers
- 2015: Castors Braine
- 2015–2016: Okzhetpes Kokshetau
- 2016–2017: ESB Villeneuve-d'Ascq
- 2017–2019: Çukurova Basketbol
- 2019–2020: Fenerbahçe
- 2020: Çukurova Basketbol
- 2021–2023: Fenerbahçe
- 2023–2024: Çukurova Basketbol
- 2024–2025: Valencia Basket
- 2025–2026: Crvena zvezda
- 2026–present: ÇBK Mersin

Career highlights
- EuroLeague champion (2023); EuroCup champion (2026); 2× EuroLeague Women MVP (2020, 2021); 2× Ukrainian SuperLeague champion (2010, 2014); Ukrainian SuperLeague MVP (2014); 2× Kazakhstan League champion (2015, 2016); Ligue Féminine de Basketball champion (2017); 3× Turkish Super League champion (2021, 2022, 2023); Turkish Presidential Cup (2019); Turkish Presidential Cup MVP (2019); Turkish Cup (2020); 2× Liga Femenina de Baloncesto champion (2024, 2025); Copa de la Reina (2024); Supercopa de España (2024)
- Stats at Basketball Reference

Alina Oleksandrivna Iagupova (Ukrainian: Аліна Олександрівна Ягупова; born February 9, 1992) is a Ukrainian basketball player for ÇBK Mersin and the Ukrainian national team for which she has been team captain.

She participated at the EuroBasket Women 2017.

== Honors ==
- EuroLeague champion (2023)
- EuroCup champion (2026)
- Turkish Super League champion (2021, 2022, 2023)
- Turkish Women's Basketball Presidential Cup champion (2019)
- Turkish Women's Basketball Cup champion (2020)
- LF Endesa League champion (2024, 2025)
- Spanish Cup champion (2024)
- Spanish Women's Basketball Supercup champion (2024)
