= 2022–23 Women's Basketball Super League =

Women's Basketball Super League
- Season: 2022–23
- Dates: October 2022 – April 2023
- Games played: 182 + Playoff games
- Teams: 14

Finals
- Champions: Fenerbahçe (17th title)
- Runners-up: ÇBK Mersin Yenişehir Bld.
- Finals MVP: (Belgium) Emma Meesseman (Fenerbahçe)

Statistical leaders
Points	(United States) Dana Evans	23.5
Rebounds	(United States) Khaalia Hillsman	12.1
Assists	(Turkey) Sevgi Uzun	7.4
Efficiency	(United States) Teaira McCowan	24.3

Seasons
- ← 2021–22 2023–24 →

The 2022–23 Women's Basketball Super League (Turkish: Kadınlar Basketbol Süper Ligi), officially called the ING Women's Basketball Super League Nilay Aydoğan Season, was the 43rd edition of the top-tier level professional women's basketball league in Turkey. The season ended with Fenerbahçe winning their fifth straight championship, defeating ÇBK Mersin Yenişehir Bld. in the play-off finals.

== Teams ==
Locations of the 2022–23 Women's Basketball Super League clubs
Istanbul Province clubs
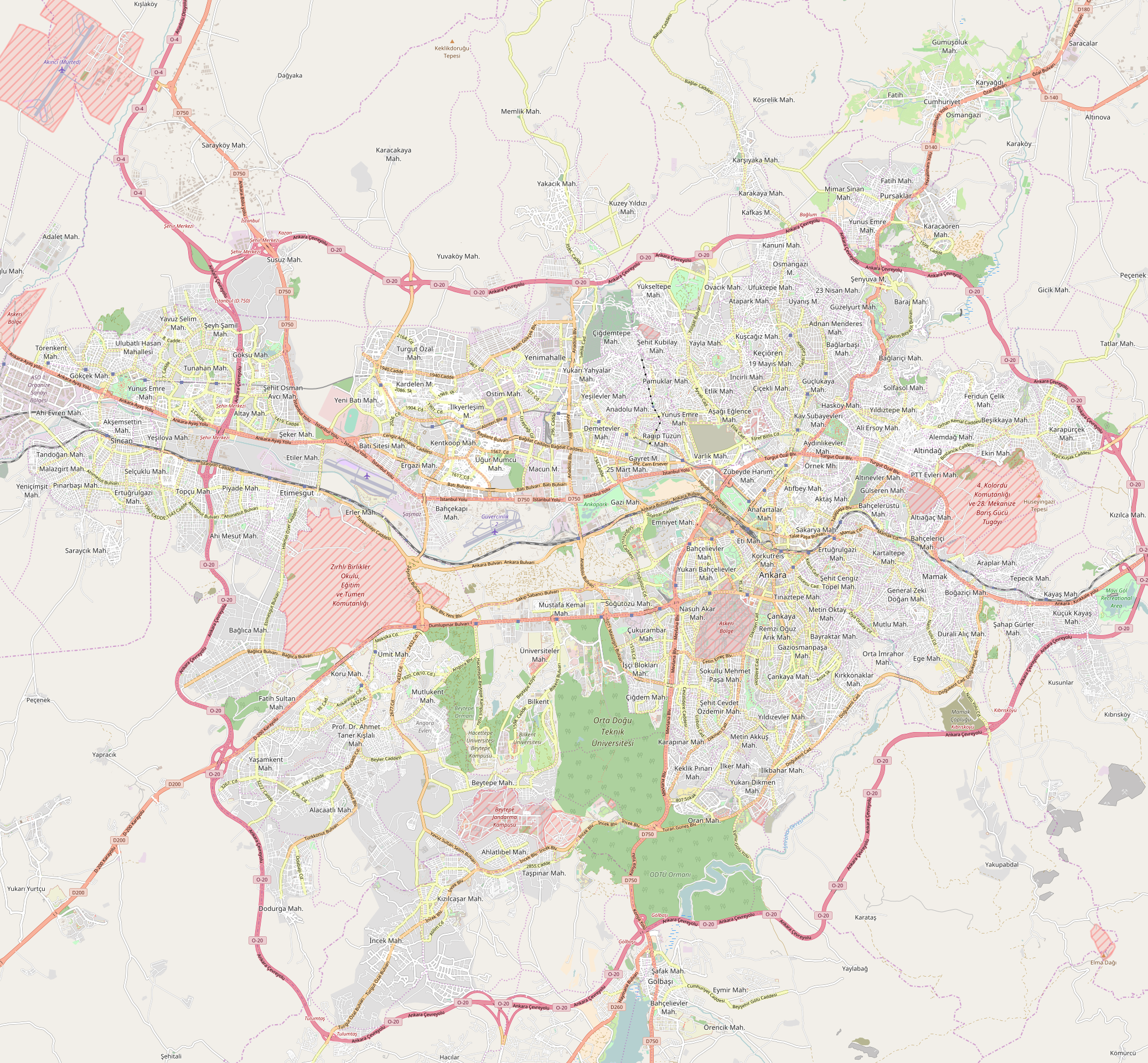
Ankara Province clubs

	Team	Home city	Arena	Head coach
1	Antalya Toroslar Basketbol	Antalya	Gazi Mustafa Kemal Sports Hall	(Turkey) Hakan Acer
2	Beşiktaş	Istanbul	Akatlar Arena	(Turkey) Aziz Akkaya
3	BOTAŞ	Ankara	Ankara DSİ Etlik Sports Hall	(Turkey) Cihat Barış Akgün
4	Bursa Uludağ Basketbol	Bursa	Tofaş Nilüfer Spor Salonu	(Turkey) Selen Erdem
5	Çankaya Üniversitesi	Ankara	Ankara Arena	(Turkey) Çağrı Özek
6	ÇBK Mersin Yenişehir Belediyesi	Mersin	Servet Tazegül Arena	(Turkey) Ekrem Memnun
7	Emlak Konut	Istanbul	Başakşehir Sports Complex	(Turkey) Murat Alkaş
8	Fenerbahçe Alagöz Holding	Istanbul	Metro Enerji Sports Hall	(Serbia) Marina Maljković
9	Galatasaray Çağdaş Faktoring	Istanbul	Ahmet Cömert Sport Hall	(Turkey) Alper Durur
10	Tufan Metalurji Hatay BB	Hatay	Antakya Sport Hall	(Turkey) Ekin Baş
11	Melikgazi Kayseri Basketbol	Kayseri	Kadir Has Spor Salonu	(Turkey) Emre Özsarı
12	Nesibe Aydın GSK	Ankara	TOBB Sport Hall	(Turkey) Erman Okerman
13	Ormanspor	Ankara	M. Sait Zarifoğlu Spor Salonu	(Turkey) Necati Uysal
14	Rize Belediyesi	Rize	Rize Sports Hall	(Turkey) Hulusi Bora Demirtürk

== Regular season ==
=== League table ===
Pos	Team	Pld	W	L	GF	GA	GD	Pts	Qualification or relegation
1	ÇBK Mersin Yenişehir Belediyesi	26	24	2	2041	1662	+379	50	Qualification to playoffs
2	Fenerbahçe Alagöz Holding	26	23	3	2308	1629	+679	49	Qualification to playoffs
3	Galatasaray Çağdaş Faktoring	26	20	6	1991	1712	+279	46	Qualification to playoffs
4	BOTAŞ	26	18	8	1915	1673	+242	44	Qualification to playoffs
5	Emlak Konut	26	16	10	1870	1759	+111	42	Qualification to playoffs
6	Nesibe Aydın	26	15	11	1993	1816	+177	41	Qualification to playoffs
7	Beşiktaş	26	12	14	1838	1887	−49	38	Qualification to playoffs
8	Çankaya Üniversitesi	26	9	17	1852	2030	−178	35	Qualification to playoffs
9	Ormanspor	26	9	17	1859	1999	−140	35	
10	Bursa Uludağ Basketbol	26	8	18	1879	2175	−296	34	
11	Melikgazi Kayseri Basketbol	26	7	19	1780	2089	−309	33	
12	Antalya Toroslar Basketbol	26	7	19	1653	2015	−362	33	
13	Rize Belediyesi	26	6	20	1645	1923	−278	32	Relegation to TKBL
14	Tufan Metalurji Hatay BB (Note: Hatay Büyükşehir Belediyespor withdrew from the league, following the 2023 Turkey–Syria earthquake, and was not relegated at the end of the season.)	26	8	18	1316	1573	−257	34	

Source: TBF

=== Results ===
Home \ Away	ANT	BJK	BOT	BUR	ÇAN	MYB	EKO	FEN	GAL	HAT	KAY	NSB	ORM	RİZ
Antalya Toroslar Basketbol	—	73–52	59–98	69–73	78–71	60–91	49–76	69–106	49–78	73–84	57–61	72–97	79–68	73–69
Beşiktaş	76–66	—	79–68	104–64	66–82	87–92	71–75	72–90	65–81	20–0^{*}	84–81	45–88	88–82	76–59
BOTAŞ	87–55	73–62	—	71–57	70–66	66–56	77–53	71–65	86–77	86–75	98–47	67–70	89–79	74–69
Bursa Uludağ Basketbol	83–78	70–86	51–113	—	61–95	85–90	67–72	62–98	83–89	62–75	86–75	75–89	65–62	82–85
Çankaya Üniversitesi	76–77	73–66	82–88	74–115	—	63–88	62–94	61–87	62–76	71–76	74–68	67–65	86–70	101–72
ÇBK Mersin Yenişehir Belediyesi	94–82	90–75	68–51	92–69	77–75	—	67–59	77–68	75–58	90–61	70–56	91–68	81–53	90–66
Emlak Konut	76–60	56–77	60–65	73–82	86–49	70–73	—	69–99	74–66	20–0^{*}	87–73	81–75	74–56	87–58
Fenerbahçe Alagöz Holding	83–45	92–57	88–64	101–74	105–44	71–63	87–83	—	80–72	20–0^{*}	97–53	82–81	106–66	98–50
Galatasaray Çağdaş Faktoring	79–59	72–58	55–47	86–58	83–57	54–68	90–68	62–80	—	91–60	80–61	76–57	92–84	75–70
Tufan Metalurji Hatay BB	0–20^{*}	81–84	0–20^{*}	79–73	65–70	0–20^{*}	77–67	75–110	55–78	—	89–70	75–84	80–68	0–20^{*}
Melikgazi Kayseri Basketbol	76–72	71–69	76–72	81–82	76–66	65–83	71–78	56–110	61–100	71–72	—	70–79	85–79	80–78
Nesibe Aydın	97–36	60–65	94–69	87–68	83–81	72–91	72–84	77–75	62–64	83–68	74–60	—	62–69	61–72
Ormanspor	87–93	87–79	78–75	90–70	94–82	68–81	68–77	72–100	62–69	20–0^{*}	82–73	69–79	—	71–62
Rize Belediyesi	77–50	61–75	52–70	61–62	44–62	60–83	68–71	54–110	69–88	82–69	71–63	44–77	72–75	—

Source: TBF
Legend: Blue = home team win; Red = away team win.

^{*} Awarded

== Playoffs ==
Quarterfinals
1	ÇBK Mersin Yenişehir Bld.	114	120	X
8	Çankaya Üniversitesi	67	61	X
4	BOTAŞ	74	85	68
5	Emlak Konut	75	64	42
2	Fenerbahçe Alagöz Holding	90	79	X
7	Beşiktaş	70	64	X
3	Galatasaray Çağdaş Faktoring	76	69	84
6	Nesibe Aydın	69	78	68

Semifinals
1	ÇBK Mersin Yenişehir Bld.	93	68	X	X	X
4	BOTAŞ	65	57	X	X	X
2	Fenerbahçe Alagöz Holding	84	87	X	X	X
3	Galatasaray Çağdaş Faktoring	60	78	X	X	X

Finals
1	ÇBK Mersin Yenişehir Bld.	68	76	56	X	X
2	Fenerbahçe Alagöz Holding	75	83	82	X	X
