= 2021–22 Women's Basketball Super League =

Women's Basketball Super League
- Season: 2021–22
- Dates: October 2021 – May 2022
- Games played: 182 + Playoff games
- Teams: 14
- TV partner(s): Tivibu

Finals
- Champions: Fenerbahçe Safiport (16th title)
- Runners-up: Çukurova Basketbol
- Finals MVP: (Germany) Satou Sabally (Fenerbahçe)

Statistical leaders
| Points | (United States) Aaryn Ellenberg-Wiley | 23.4 |
| Rebounds | (United States) Teaira McCowan | 13.7 |
| Assists | (Turkey) Özge Özışık | 6.6 |
| Efficiency | (United States) Teaira McCowan | 28.0 |

Seasons
- ← 2020–21 2022–23 →

The 2021–22 Women's Basketball Super League (Turkish: Kadınlar Basketbol Süper Ligi) was the 42nd edition of the top-tier level professional women's basketball league in Turkey.

== Teams ==
Adana Basketbol and Canik Belediyespor finished the 2020–21 regular season in the last two places and were relegated to the Second League (TKBL). In May 2021, Bursa Büyükşehir Belediyespor as the regular season champion and Antalya 07 Basketbol as the play-off winner, were promoted to the Super League.

Locations of the 2021–22 Women's Basketball Super League clubs

| # | Team | City | Arena | Head coach | Previous season |
|---|---|---|---|---|---|
| 1 | Antalya 07 Basketbol | Antalya | Gazi Mustafa Kemal Spor Salonu | (Turkey) Rıza Darendelioğlu | New team |
| 2 | Beşiktaş | Istanbul | Akatlar Spor ve Kültür Kompleksi | (Turkey) Ayhan Avcı | 12th place |
| 3 | BOTAŞ | Ankara | Ankara Dsi Spor Salonu | (Turkey) Cihat Barış Akgün | 7th place |
| 4 | Bursa Büyükşehir Belediyespor | Bursa | Naim Süleymanoğlu Spor Kompleksi | (Turkey) Aydın Uğuz | New team |
| 5 | Çankaya Üniversitesi | Ankara | Ankara Spor Salonu | (Turkey) Çağrı Özek | 4th place |
| 6 | Çukurova Basketbol | Mersin | Servet Tazegül Spor Salonu | (Turkey) Aziz Akkaya | 6th place |
| 7 | Elazığ İl Özel İdarespor | Elazığ | Çimentaş İl Özel İdare Spor Salonu | (Turkey) Mehmet Özkan | 11th place |
| 8 | Fenerbahçe Safiport | Istanbul | Metro Enerji Spor Salonu | (Serbia) Marina Maljković | Champion |
| 9 | Galatasaray | Istanbul | Şehit Mustafa Özel Spor Kompleksi | (Turkey) Efe Güven | Runner-up |
| 10 | Hatayspor | Hatay | Antakya Spor Salonu | (Turkey) Ekin Baş | 8th place |
| 11 | İzmit Belediyespor | Kocaeli | Şehit Polis Recep Topaloğlu Spor Salonu | (Turkey) Fırat Okul | 9th place |
| 12 | Kayseri Basketbol | Kayseri | Kadir Has Kongre Merkezi Spor Salonu | (Turkey) Tolga Esenci | 10th place |
| 13 | Nesibe Aydın | Ankara | TOBB ETÜ Spor Salonu | (Turkey) Erman Okerman | 3rd place |
| 14 | Ormanspor | Ankara | M. Sait Zarifoğlu Spor Salonu | (Turkey) Alper Durur | 5th place |

== Regular season ==
=== League table ===
| Pos | Team | Pld | W | L | PF | PA | PD | Pts | Qualification or relegation |
|---|---|---|---|---|---|---|---|---|---|
| 1 | Fenerbahçe Safiport | 26 | 24 | 2 | 2321 | 1589 | +732 | 50 | Qualification to playoffs |
| 2 | Çukurova Basketbol | 26 | 20 | 6 | 2066 | 1682 | +384 | 46 | Qualification to playoffs |
| 3 | Ormanspor | 26 | 20 | 6 | 2069 | 1822 | +247 | 46 | Qualification to playoffs |
| 4 | Nesibe Aydın | 26 | 18 | 8 | 1988 | 1845 | +143 | 44 | Qualification to playoffs |
| 5 | Galatasaray | 26 | 17 | 9 | 1878 | 1732 | +146 | 43 | Qualification to playoffs |
| 6 | BOTAŞ | 26 | 15 | 11 | 1992 | 1848 | +144 | 41 | Qualification to playoffs |
| 7 | Bursa Büyükşehir Belediyespor | 26 | 13 | 13 | 1846 | 1987 | −141 | 39 | Qualification to playoffs |
| 8 | Çankaya Üniversitesi | 26 | 11 | 15 | 1982 | 2078 | −96 | 37 | Qualification to playoffs |
| 9 | Beşiktaş | 26 | 11 | 15 | 1881 | 1947 | −66 | 37 | |
| 10 | Hatayspor | 26 | 9 | 17 | 1976 | 2113 | −137 | 35 | |
| 11 | Antalya 07 Basketbol | 26 | 8 | 18 | 1668 | 1956 | −288 | 34 | |
| 12 | Kayseri Basketbol | 26 | 7 | 19 | 1801 | 2026 | −225 | 33 | |
| 13 | İzmit Belediyespor (R) | 26 | 7 | 19 | 1830 | 2078 | −248 | 33 | Relegation to TKBL |
| 14 | Elazığ İl Özel İdarespor (R) | 26 | 2 | 24 | 1643 | 2238 | −595 | 28 | Relegation to TKBL |

Source: TBF
(R) Relegated

=== Positions by round ===
| Team ╲ Round | 1 | 2 | 3 | 4 | 5 | 6 | 7 | 8 | 9 | 10 | 11 | 12 | 13 | 14 | 15 | 16 | 17 | 18 | 19 | 20 | 21 | 22 | 23 | 24 | 25 | 26 |
|---|---|---|---|---|---|---|---|---|---|---|---|---|---|---|---|---|---|---|---|---|---|---|---|---|---|---|
| Fenerbahçe Safiport | 3 | 2 | 1 | 1 | 1 | 1 | 1 | 1 | 1 | 1 | 1 | 1 | 1 | 1 | 1 | 1 | 1 | 1 | 1 | 1 | 1 | 1 | 1 | 1 | 1 | 1 |
| Çukurova Basketbol | 5 | 3 | 2 | 2 | 4 | 4 | 4 | 6 | 5 | 4 | 3 | 3 | 2 | 2 | 3 | 3 | 2 | 4 | 4 | 4 | 4 | 4 | 4 | 3 | 2 | 2 |
| Ormanspor | 2 | 6 | 4 | 3 | 2 | 2 | 2 | 2 | 2 | 3 | 2 | 2 | 3 | 3 | 4 | 4 | 3 | 2 | 2 | 2 | 2 | 2 | 2 | 2 | 3 | 3 |
| Nesibe Aydın | 4 | 1 | 5 | 4 | 3 | 3 | 3 | 3 | 3 | 2 | 4 | 4 | 4 | 5 | 2 | 2 | 5 | 3 | 3 | 3 | 3 | 3 | 3 | 4 | 4 | 4 |
| Galatasaray | 6 | 4 | 8 | 8 | 5 | 5 | 5 | 4 | 6 | 6 | 6 | 6 | 6 | 6 | 7 | 7 | 7 | 6 | 7 | 6 | 7 | 7 | 7 | 7 | 5 | 5 |
| BOTAŞ | 9 | 10 | 11 | 12 | 13 | 11 | 11 | 10 | 9 | 8 | 8 | 8 | 7 | 7 | 6 | 6 | 6 | 5 | 6 | 7 | 5 | 6 | 5 | 5 | 6 | 6 |
| Bursa BB | 8 | 8 | 6 | 5 | 7 | 6 | 6 | 5 | 4 | 5 | 5 | 5 | 5 | 4 | 5 | 5 | 4 | 7 | 5 | 5 | 6 | 5 | 6 | 6 | 7 | 7 |
| Çankaya Üniversitesi | 12 | 13 | 13 | 10 | 10 | 10 | 10 | 11 | 10 | 10 | 10 | 9 | 9 | 9 | 10 | 12 | 9 | 9 | 10 | 10 | 10 | 8 | 8 | 8 | 8 | 8 |
| Beşiktaş | 11 | 12 | 12 | 13 | 14 | 14 | 12 | 13 | 13 | 12 | 12 | 12 | 11 | 10 | 9 | 9 | 10 | 10 | 8 | 8 | 8 | 9 | 10 | 9 | 9 | 9 |
| Hatayspor | 1 | 7 | 7 | 6 | 6 | 7 | 7 | 7 | 7 | 7 | 7 | 7 | 8 | 8 | 8 | 8 | 8 | 8 | 9 | 9 | 9 | 10 | 9 | 10 | 10 | 10 |
| Antalya 07 Basketbol | 7 | 5 | 3 | 7 | 8 | 9 | 9 | 9 | 11 | 11 | 11 | 11 | 10 | 11 | 11 | 11 | 11 | 11 | 12 | 12 | 11 | 12 | 11 | 11 | 11 | 11 |
| Kayseri Basketbol | 10 | 11 | 10 | 11 | 12 | 13 | 14 | 12 | 12 | 13 | 13 | 13 | 13 | 13 | 13 | 13 | 13 | 12 | 11 | 11 | 12 | 11 | 12 | 12 | 12 | 12 |
| İzmit Belediyespor | 13 | 9 | 9 | 9 | 9 | 8 | 8 | 8 | 8 | 9 | 9 | 10 | 12 | 12 | 12 | 10 | 12 | 13 | 13 | 13 | 13 | 13 | 13 | 13 | 13 | 13 |
| Elazığ İl Özel İdarespor | 14 | 14 | 14 | 14 | 11 | 12 | 13 | 14 | 14 | 14 | 14 | 14 | 14 | 14 | 14 | 14 | 14 | 14 | 14 | 14 | 14 | 14 | 14 | 14 | 14 | 14 |

| Leader |
| Qualification to the playoffs |
| Relegated |

Source: TBF

=== Results ===
| Home \ Away | FEN | ORM | NSB | ÇBK | BOT | BUR | GAL | ÇAN | HAT | BJK | KAY | ANT | İZB | ELA |
|---|---|---|---|---|---|---|---|---|---|---|---|---|---|---|
| Fenerbahçe Safiport | — | 91–65 | 70–53 | 72–59 | 85–78 | 94–62 | 74–56 | 89–57 | 95–69 | 91–66 | 96–58 | 92–38 | 106–44 | 96–42 |
| Ormanspor | 75–82 | — | 64–63 | 57–77 | 77–61 | 88–62 | 90–93 | 79–61 | 92–74 | 77–57 | 89–63 | 84–63 | 94–57 | 96–73 |
| Nesibe Aydın | 55–90 | 83–72 | — | 84–76 | 74–62 | 84–74 | 90–85 | 101–69 | 78–60 | 74–79 | 81–72 | 70–66 | 88–82 | 96–58 |
| Çukurova Basketbol | 73–80 | 94–63 | 83–88 | — | 68–56 | 78–54 | 74–72 | 86–72 | 86–88 | 87–68 | 75–40 | 83–48 | 87–50 | 82–64 |
| BOTAŞ | 80–90 | 63–70 | 61–79 | 76–65 | — | 98–60 | 65–71 | 72–95 | 91–71 | 101–74 | 81–64 | 65–75 | 88–75 | 90–51 |
| Bursa BB | 84–80 | 70–97 | 84–71 | 53–73 | 64–71 | — | 58–55 | 95–89 | 67–60 | 63–67 | 64–89 | 75–76 | 78–74 | 78–72 |
| Galatasaray | 69–63 | 61–65 | 67–49 | 62–65 | 65–75 | 84–74 | — | 66–54 | 83–59 | 57–66 | 58–61 | 72–45 | 74–63 | 58–43 |
| Çankaya Üniversitesi | 62–102 | 81–88 | 84–86 | 66–92 | 61–67 | 68–72 | 86–92 | — | 101–87 | 86–72 | 71–61 | 76–75 | 75–93 | 84–51 |
| Hatayspor | 49–91 | 72–76 | 76–71 | 62–92 | 82–77 | 50–66 | 76–81 | 80–83 | — | 69–84 | 87–79 | 76–70 | 93–90 | 103–51 |
| Beşiktaş | 52–78 | 68–81 | 58–74 | 69–78 | 61–62 | 70–78 | 65–72 | 79–82 | 96–88 | — | 80–48 | 81–54 | 84–81 | 86–59 |
| Kayseri Basketbol | 58–99 | 59–70 | 77–71 | 75–85 | 78–92 | 79–83 | 72–78 | 73–87 | 93–94 | 66–75 | — | 69–60 | 64–68 | 81–73 |
| Antalya 07 Basketbol | 71–105 | 63–73 | 54–76 | 55–82 | 68–86 | 69–77 | 62–87 | 70–72 | 71–67 | 73–80 | 81–70 | — | 71–69 | 63–58 |
| İzmit Belediyespor | 68–105 | 65–86 | 60–70 | 55–85 | 61–69 | 67–77 | 69–80 | 82–79 | 88–81 | 85–67 | 53–60 | 51–60 | — | 90–74 |
| Elazığ İl Özel İdarespor | 46–105 | 66–101 | 62–79 | 53–81 | 64–105 | 84–74 | 69–80 | 68–81 | 61–103 | 83–77 | 75–92 | 60–67 | 83–90 | — |

Updated to match(es) played on April 16, 2022. Source: TBF
Legend: Blue = home team win; Red = away team win.

== Playoffs ==
Quarterfinals
1 | Fenerbahçe Safiport | 91 | 86 | X
8 | Çankaya Üniversitesi | 57 | 65 | X
4 | Nesibe Aydın | 94 | 53 | X
5 | Galatasaray | 79 | 49 | X
2 | Çukurova Basketbol | 79 | 83 | X
7 | Bursa Büyükşehir Belediyespor | 42 | 57 | X
3 | Ormanspor | 72 | 77 | 70
6 | BOTAŞ | 71 | 83 | 61

Semifinals
1 | Fenerbahçe Safiport | 73 | 97 | 100 | X | X
4 | Nesibe Aydın | 71 | 62 | 78 | X | X
2 | Çukurova Basketbol | 91 | 75 | 80 | X | X
3 | Ormanspor | 64 | 68 | 51 | X | X

Finals
1 | Fenerbahçe Safiport | 90 | 95 | 97 | X | X
2 | Çukurova Basketbol | 55 | 56 | 71 | X | X

== See also ==
- 2022 Turkish Cup
