= Jessica Thomas (basketball) =

American-Cameroonian basketball player (born 1994)

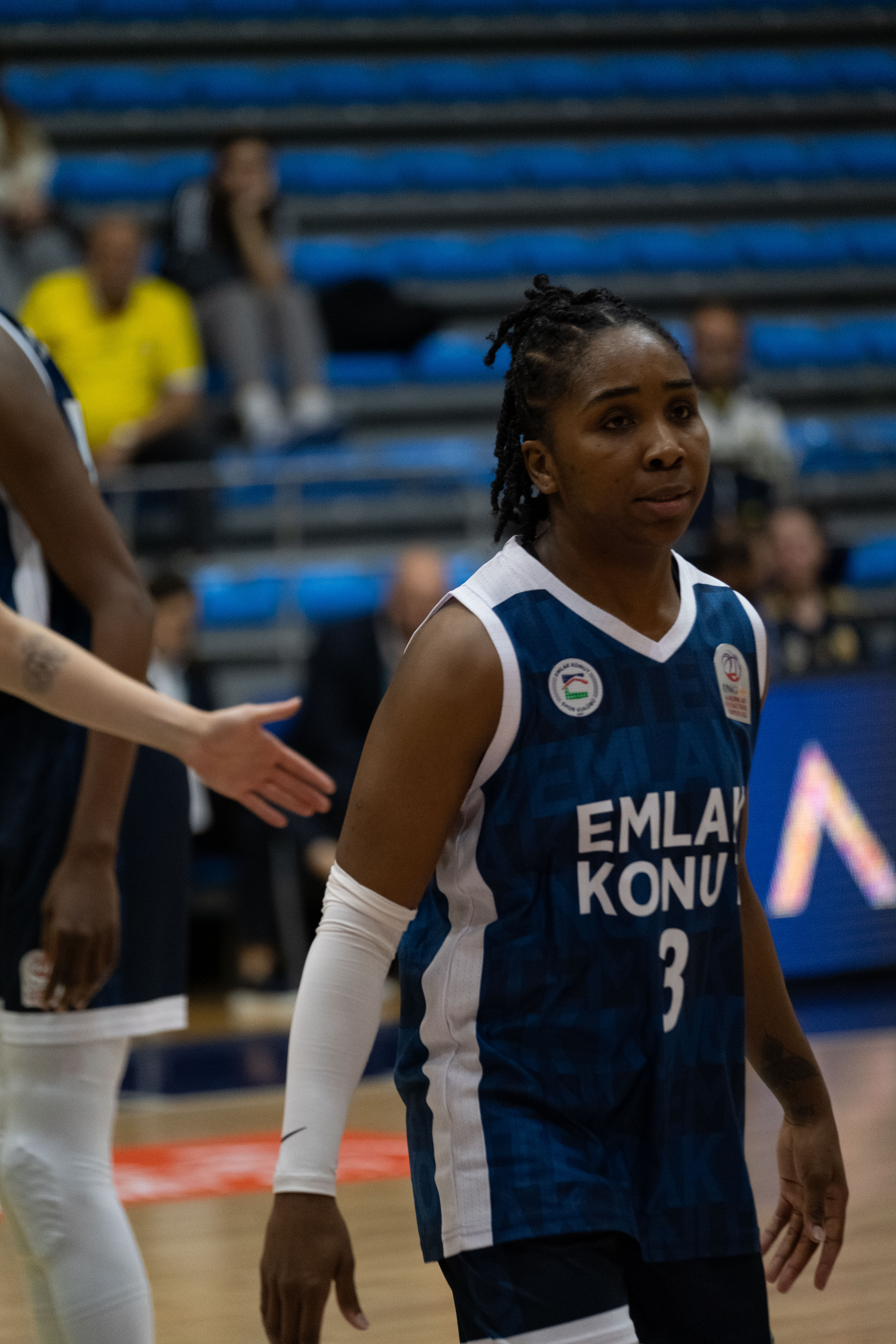
- Thomas in 2024

No. 3 – ÇBK Mersin
- Position: Guard
- League: KBSL

Personal information
- Born: October 27, 1994 (age 32) Gainesville, Florida, U.S.
- Listed height: 5 ft 6 in (1.68 m)

Career information
- High school: Buchholz (Gainesville, Florida)
- College: Miami (FL) (2013–2017)
- WNBA draft: 2017: undrafted
- Playing career: 2017–present

Career history
- 2017–2018: Luleå Basket
- 2018–2020: Olympiacos
- 2020–2021: TTT Riga
- 2021–2023: Nesibe Aydın
- 2023: ASVEL Féminin
- 2023–2024: Nesibe Aydın
- 2024: Adelitas de Chihuahua
- 2024–2026: Emlak Konut
- 2026–present: ÇBK Mersin

Career highlights
- Ligue Féminine champion (2023); 2× Greek Basketball League (2019, 2020); Latvian Basketball League champion (2021); Greek Basketball Cup (2019); ACC All-Tournament Second Team (2016); 2× All-ACC Academic Team (2016, 2017); Florida Sunshine Classic All-Tournament Team (2016)

Jessica Lauren Thomas (born October 27, 1994) is an American-Cameroonian professional basketball player who plays for ÇBK Mersin of the Women's Basketball Super League.

== Early life ==
Thomas was born on October 27, 1994, in Gainesville, Florida. She attended Buchholz High School in her hometown. She has three older brothers: Eric, Daren and Lamar, who played football at Miami and in the NFL. Thomas majored in sport administration.

== College ==
Thomas played college basketball at the University of Miami, where she averaged 9.9 points, 2.9 assists and 2.7 rebounds over four years. She started 100 of the 130 games she played. Being a co-captain for the team, she became the 25th player in program history to reach 1,000 career points and finished her career among Miami's all-time leaders in games played, 3-pointers, and assists. She also earned All-ACC Academic honors and All-Tournament recognition during her junior year.

Over her four seasons, Thomas developed into a reliable all-around guard, known for her playmaking, perimeter shooting, and durability, appearing in nearly every game and steadily improving her scoring and leadership each year.

== Career ==
On June 7, 2021, Thomas signed with Nesibe Aydın.

On April 13, 2023, ASVEL Féminin announced the signing of Thomas.

== Career statistics ==
=== College ===
Year	Team	GP	Points	FG%	3P%	FT%	RPG	APG	SPG	BPG	PPG
2013–14	Miami	31	158	.342	.261	.732	1.9	1.6	0.9	0.1	5.1
2014–15	Miami	33	307	.343	.290	.735	2.7	2.2	1.2	0.1	9.3
2015–16	Miami	33	387	.383	.354	.616	3.7	3.6	1.5	0.2	11.7
2016–17	Miami	33	429	.369	.291	.781	2.4	3.9	1.6	0.1	13.0
Career		130	1,281	.363	.305	.727	2.7	2.9	1.3	0.1	9.9
