= 2022–23 EuroLeague Women =

European women's club basketball championship

EuroLeague Women
- Season: 2022–23
- Dates: Qualifying: 11–19 October 2022; Regular Season: 26 October 2022 – 1 March 2023; Quarterfinals: 14–22 March 2023; Final Four: 14–16 April 2023
- Games played: 127
- Teams: Competition proper: 16; Total: 20

Regular season
- Season MVP: (Belgium) Emma Meesseman (Fenerbahçe)

Finals
- Champions: (Turkish Basketball Federation) Fenerbahçe (1st title)
- Runners-up: (Turkish Basketball Federation) ÇBK Mersin Yenişehir Bld.
- Third place: (Italian Basketball Federation) Beretta Famila Schio
- Fourth place: (Czech Basketball Federation) ZVVZ USK Praha
- Final Four MVP: (United States) Breanna Stewart (Fenerbahçe)

Statistical leaders
Points	(United States) Megan Gustafson	22.6
Rebounds	(United States) Stephanie Mavunga	12.5
Assists	(United States) Erica Wheeler	7.4
Index Rating	(United States) Megan Gustafson	25.5

Records
- Biggest home win: Fenerbahçe 111–61 BC Polkowice (4 January 2023)
- Biggest away win: KSC Szekszárd 56–95 ZVVZ USK Praha (4 January 2023)
- Highest scoring: KSC Szekszárd 103–101 Fenerbahçe (2 November 2022)
- Highest attendance: 7,000; ÇBK Mersin Yenişehir Bld. 84–56 Tango Bourges Basket (14 March 2023)
- Lowest attendance: 100; Olympiacos 87–68 KSC Szekszárd (25 January 2023); Olympiacos 54–85 ZVVZ USK Praha (22 February 2023)

The 2022–23 EuroLeague Women was the 65th edition of the European women's club basketball championship organized by FIBA, and the 26th edition since being rebranded as the EuroLeague Women.

Fenerbahçe won its first championship after defeating ÇBK Mersin Yenişehir Bld. 99–60 in the all-Turkish final, having participated in the Final Four nine times to date.

== Teams ==
League positions of the previous season shown in parentheses (TH: EuroLeague Women title holders; EC: EuroCup Women title holders).

Regular season
(Czech Basketball Federation) ZVVZ USK Praha (1st)	(Basketball Belgium) Kangoeroes Basket Mechelen (1st)
(French Federation of Basketball) Tango Bourges Basket^{EC} (1st)	(Spanish Basketball Federation) Perfumerías Avenida (1st)
(French Federation of Basketball) Basket Landes (CW, 4th)	(Spanish Basketball Federation) Valencia Basket (2nd)
(Hungarian Basketball Federation) Sopron Basket^{TH} (1st)	(Turkish Basketball Federation) Fenerbahçe (1st)
(Hungarian Basketball Federation) KSC Szekszárd (2nd)	(Turkish Basketball Federation) ÇBK Mersin Yenişehir Bld. (2nd)
(Italian Basketball Federation) Beretta Famila Schio (1st)	(Polish Basketball Federation) BC Polkowice (1st)
(Italian Basketball Federation) Virtus Segafredo Bologna (2nd)
Qualifying round
Conference 1	Conference 2
(Turkish Basketball Federation) Botaş SK (6th)	(French Federation of Basketball) ESB Villeneuve-d'Ascq (3rd)
(Romanian Basketball Federation) ACS Sepsi SIC (1st)	(Spanish Basketball Federation) Spar Girona (3rd)
(Basketball Federation of Serbia) Crvena zvezda (1st)	
(Hellenic Basketball Federation) Olympiacos (1st)	
(Israeli Basketball Association) Elitzur Ramla (1st)	
(Hungarian Basketball Federation) Aluinvent DVTK Miskolc (3rd)	

== Referees ==
Referees of the 2022–23 season^{1}
(Andorra) Igor Esteve; (Austria) Goran Sljivić; (Azerbaijan) Alakbar Hasanov; (Bosnia and Herzegovina) Haris Bijedić; (Bosnia and Herzegovina) Hrvoje Ćavar; (Bosnia and Herzegovina) Bojan Jovanić; (Bosnia and Herzegovina) Goran Stojančević; (Bulgaria) Vladimir Zanev; (Croatia) Alfred Jovović; (Croatia) Josip Mikulić; (Croatia) Nikola Perlić; (Croatia) Jelena Tomić; (Cyprus) Maria Ignatiou; (Czech Republic) Jan Baloun; (Czech Republic) Petr Hruša; (Czech Republic) Martin Kučírek; (Czech Republic) Veronika Vávrová; (Denmark) Andrada Monika Csender; (Denmark) Rune Ressel Larsen; (Estonia) Mart Uuehendrik; (Finland) Karol Kowalski; (Finland) Ville Selkee; (France) Laure Coanus; (France) Amel Dahra; (France) Alexandre Maret; (France) Marion Ortis; (Germany) Armin Mutapčić	(Gibraltar) James Kerry Dominique; (United Kingdom) Simon Unsworth; (Greece) Stylianos Simeonidis; (Greece) Nikolaos Tziopanos; (Greece) Dimitrios Zacharis; (Hungary) Gellért Kapitány; (Hungary) Viktor Nagy; (Hungary) Cecília Tóth; (Republic of Ireland) Emma Perry; (Israel) Nir Meirson; (Italy) Valerio Grigioni; (Italy) Alessandro Perciavalle; (Kosovo) Xhelal Mumini; (Latvia) Einārs Tukišs; (Lithuania) Juozas Barkauskas; (Lithuania) Aurimas Borusas; (Lithuania) Gintaras Vitkauskas; (Montenegro) Nataša Dragojević; (Montenegro) Mladen Lučić; (Montenegro) Ivana Radinović; (Montenegro) Suzana Vujičić; (North Macedonia) Zoran Mitrovski; (North Macedonia) Tomi Panov; (Netherlands) Tijmen Last; (Netherlands) Bert van Slooten; (Norway) Nikola Bejat	(Poland) Paulina Gajdosz; (Poland) Łukasz Jankowski; (Poland) Ewa Matuszewska; (Portugal) José Pedroso; (Portugal) Sonia Teixeira; (Romania) Alin Faur; (Romania) Amalia Marchiş; (Romania) Dragoş Nicolae; (Romania) Alexandra Stan; (Romania) Ciprian Stoica; (Serbia) Ivana Ivanović; (Serbia) Nemanja Ninković; (Serbia) Petar Pešić; (Serbia) Jelena Smiljanić; (Slovakia) Pavel Fuska; (Slovakia) Peter Ženiš; (Slovenia) Goran Grbić; (Slovenia) Nace Mohorič; (Slovenia) Diana Lapanović; (Slovenia) Primož Pipan; (Spain) Yasmina Alcaraz; (Spain) Esperanza Mendoza; (Spain) Javier Torres; (Turkey) Çisil Güngör; (Turkey) Özge Şentürk; (Turkey) Sinem Tetik; (Ukraine) Vladyslav Isachenko	Notes: 1. Every BCL official is eligible to referee the EuroLeague Women.

== Qualifying round ==
=== Qualifiers play-off ===
Team 1	Agg.	Team 2	1st leg	2nd leg
ESB Villeneuve-d'Ascq (France)	112–123	(Spain) Spar Girona (Q)	69–57	43–66

Source: FIBA
(Q) Qualified for the phase indicated

=== Qualifying Tournament A ===
Pos	Team	Pld	W	L	PF	PA	PD	Pts	Qualification	OLY	SEP	CZV
1	(Greece) Olympiacos (Q)	2	2	0	157	114	+43	4	Regular season		73–54	
2	(Romania) ACS Sepsi SIC	2	1	1	137	136	+1	3	EuroCup Women			83–63
3	(Serbia) Crvena zvezda (H)	2	0	2	123	167	−44	2	EuroCup Women	60–84		

Source: FIBA
Legend: Blue = home team win; Red = away team win.
(H) Hosts; (Q) Qualified for the phase indicated

=== Qualifying Tournament B ===
Pos	Team	Pld	W	L	PF	PA	PD	Pts	Qualification	MIS	RAM	BOT
1	(Hungary) Aluinvent DVTK Miskolc (H, Q)	2	2	0	155	108	+47	4	Regular season			75–54
2	(Israel) Elitzur Ramla	2	1	1	126	144	−18	3	EuroCup Women	54–80		
3	(Turkey) Botaş SK	2	0	2	118	147	−29	2	EuroCup Women		64–72	

Source: FIBA
Legend: Blue = home team win; Red = away team win.
(H) Hosts; (Q) Qualified for the phase indicated

== Regular season ==
=== Group A ===
Pos	Team	Pld	W	L	PF	PA	PD	Pts	Qualification	FEN	USK	VAL	TBB	POL	VIR	KSC	OLY
1	(Turkey) Fenerbahçe	14	12	2	1209	1003	+206	26	Advance to quarterfinals	—	82–72	93–61	83–64	111–61	95–73	91–71	95–89
2	(Czech Republic) ZVVZ USK Praha	14	10	4	1119	935	+184	24	Advance to quarterfinals	66–73	—	75–82	65–57	80–83	71–50	82–71	95–63
3	(Spain) Valencia Basket	14	9	5	998	972	+26	23	Advance to quarterfinals	66–72	76–83	—	76–68	69–64	73–71	74–59	65–55
4	(France) Tango Bourges Basket	14	8	6	996	969	+27	22	Advance to quarterfinals	79–90	70–73	70–68	—	62–63	79–74	83–62	67–61
5	(Poland) BC Polkowice	14	8	6	1030	1039	−9	22		73–46	57–92	76–73	66–75	—	69–88	89–56	76–52
6	(Italy) Virtus Segafredo Bologna	14	5	9	1031	1036	−5	19		67–85	61–85	73–75	61–64	89–76	—	89–59	92–69
7	(Hungary) KSC Szekszárd	14	3	11	947	1170	−223	17		103–101	56–95	54–75	61–77	76–94	73–64	—	78–69
8	(Greece) Olympiacos	14	1	13	915	1121	−206	15		58–92	54–85	59–65	66–81	70–83	63–79	87–68	—

Source: FIBA
Legend: Blue = home team win; Red = away team win.
Rules for classification: 1) Points; 2) Points difference; 3) Points scored.

=== Group B ===
Pos	Team	Pld	W	L	PF	PA	PD	Pts	Qualification	MER	SCH	AVE	SOP	GIR	MIS	BLAN	MEC
1	(Turkey) ÇBK Mersin Yenişehir Bld.	14	10	4	986	941	+45	24	Advance to quarterfinals	—	79–67	85–80	50–75	64–50	77–58	75–59	69–62
2	(Italy) Beretta Famila Schio	14	10	4	1025	963	+62	24	Advance to quarterfinals	76–72	—	71–54	81–50	70–65	90–82	85–71	74–70
3	(Spain) Perfumerías Avenida	14	9	5	1012	919	+93	23	Advance to quarterfinals	83–66	61–72	—	74–61	74–63	94–52	81–57	79–72
4	(Hungary) Sopron Basket	14	8	6	924	888	+36	22	Advance to quarterfinals	51–44	80–61	53–75	—	62–60	75–65	59–62	71–64
5	(Spain) Spar Girona	14	7	7	924	879	+45	21		73–75	83–63	74–48	63–60	—	58–64	65–54	71–59
6	(Hungary) Aluinvent DVTK Miskolc	14	6	8	962	1022	−60	20		77–78	65–63	61–70	77–75	56–74	—	67–58	79–78
7	(France) Basket Landes	14	4	10	870	973	−103	18		61–68	58–78	71–64	50–61	53–58	72–63	—	68–78
8	(Belgium) Kangoeroes Basket Mechelen	14	2	12	956	1074	−118	16		69–84	73–74	61–75	62–91	77–67	60–96	71–76	—

Source: FIBA
Legend: Blue = home team win; Red = away team win.
Rules for classification: 1) Points; 2) Points difference; 3) Points scored.

== Quarterfinals ==
Team 1	Series	Team 2	Game 1	Game 2	Game 3
Fenerbahçe (Turkey)	2–0	(Hungary) Sopron Basket	82–62	82–62	–
Beretta Famila Schio (Italy)	2–1	(Spain) Valencia Basket	75–63	75–80	62–53
ÇBK Mersin Yenişehir Bld. (Turkey)	2–1	(France) Tango Bourges Basket	84–56	75–76	91–63
ZVVZ USK Praha (Czech Republic)	2–1	(Spain) Perfumerías Avenida	77–56	71–73 OT	74–66

== Final Four ==
=== Bracket ===
Semifinals
14 April
(Turkish Basketball Federation) Fenerbahçe	77
(Italian Basketball Federation) Beretta Famila Schio	70
14 April
(Czech Basketball Federation) ZVVZ USK Praha	58
(Turkish Basketball Federation) ÇBK Mersin Yenişehir Bld.	78

Final
16 April
(Turkish Basketball Federation) Fenerbahçe	99
(Turkish Basketball Federation) ÇBK Mersin Yenişehir Bld.	60
Third place
16 April
(Italian Basketball Federation) Beretta Famila Schio	59
(Czech Basketball Federation) ZVVZ USK Praha	56

=== Semifinals ===
14 April 2023	Fenerbahçe (Turkish Basketball Federation)	77–70	(Italian Basketball Federation) Beretta Famila Schio	Prague
15:00 (UTC+2)	Scoring by quarter: 16–21, 20–19, 25–14, 16–16
	Pts: Stewart 24; Rebs: Stewart 11; Asts: Vandersloot 11; PIR: Stewart 29	Boxscore	Pts: Keys 19; Rebs: Howard 9 Asts: three players 4 PIR: Keys 21	Arena: Královka Arena; Attendance: 2,154; Referees: Viola Györgyi (ROU), Gatis Saliņš (LAT), Martin Vulić (CRO)

14 April 2023	ZVVZ USK Praha (Czech Basketball Federation)	58–78	(Turkish Basketball Federation) ÇBK Mersin Yenişehir Bld.	Prague
18:00 (UTC+2)	Scoring by quarter: 18–24, 22–20, 9–18, 9–16
	Pts: Vukosavljević 15; Rebs: Thomas 12; Asts: Thomas 6 PIR: Thomas 17	Boxscore	Pts: Hayes 19; Rebs: Crvendakić 12; Asts: Gray 9 PIR: Williams 26	Arena: Královka Arena; Attendance: 2,500; Referees: Andris Aunkrogers (LAT), Michał Proc (POL), Carsten Straube (GER)

=== Third place game ===
16 April 2023	Beretta Famila Schio (Italian Basketball Federation)	59–56	(Czech Basketball Federation) ZVVZ USK Praha	Prague
17:00 (UTC+2)	Scoring by quarter: 23–14, 16–14, 9–14, 11–14
	Pts: Mabrey 17; Rebs: Keys, Ndour-Fall 6 Asts: Verona, Sottana 3 PIR: Ndour-Fall 15	Boxscore	Pts: Oblak 17; Rebs: Jones 15; Asts: Oblak, Vukosavljević 4 PIR: Thomas 22	Arena: Královka Arena; Attendance: 2,500; Referees: Cecília Tóth (HUN), Esperanza Mendoza Holgado (ESP), Amel Dahra (FRA)

=== Final ===
16 April 2023	Fenerbahçe (Turkish Basketball Federation)	99–60	(Turkish Basketball Federation) ÇBK Mersin Yenişehir Bld.	Prague
20:00 (UTC+2)	Scoring by quarter: 29–17, 28–7, 20–20, 22–16
	Pts: Stewart 35; Rebs: Meesseman 7 Asts: Vandersloot, McBride 5 PIR: Stewart 36	Boxscore	Pts: four players 10; Rebs: Crvendakić 7 Asts: Gray 6 PIR: Crvendakić 15	Arena: Královka Arena; Attendance: 2,500; Referees: Andris Aunkrogers (LAT), Viola Györgyi (ROU), Gatis Saliņš (LAT)

2022–23 EuroLeague Women Champions

Fenerbahçe
First title

== Awards ==
=== EuroLeague MVP ===
- (Belgium) Emma Meesseman ( (Turkey) Fenerbahçe)

=== EuroLeague Final Four MVP ===
- (United States) Breanna Stewart ( (Turkey) Fenerbahçe)

=== All-EuroLeague Teams ===
First Team		Second Team	
(United States) Chelsea Gray	(Turkey) ÇBK Mersin Yenişehir Bld.	(Ukraine) Alina Iagupova	(Turkey) Fenerbahçe
(Serbia) Yvonne Anderson	(France) Tango Bourges Basket	(United States) Marina Mabrey	(Italy) Beretta Famila Schio
(United States) Breanna Stewart	(Turkey) Fenerbahçe	(Serbia) Jelena Brooks	(Hungary) Sopron Basket
(United States) Alyssa Thomas	(Czech Republic) ZVVZ USK Praha	(Spain) Raquel Carrera	(Spain) Valencia Basket
(Belgium) Emma Meesseman	(Turkey) Fenerbahçe	(Greece) Mariella Fasoula	(Spain) Perfumerías Avenida

=== Defensive Player of the Year ===
- (United States) Alyssa Thomas ( (Czech Republic) ZVVZ USK Praha)

=== Young Player of the Year ===
- (France) Pauline Astier ( (France) Tango Bourges Basket)

=== Coach of the Year ===
- (Greece) George Dikeoulakos ( (Italy) Beretta Famila Schio)

=== MVP of the Round ===
Regular season

Round	Player	Team	PIR	Ref.
1	(United States) Stephanie Mavunga	(Polish Basketball Federation) BC Polkowice	37	
2	(United States) Megan Gustafson	(Hellenic Basketball Federation) Olympiacos	34	
3	(United States) Megan Gustafson (2)	(Hellenic Basketball Federation) Olympiacos	38	
4	(United States) Stephanie Mavunga (2)	(Polish Basketball Federation) BC Polkowice	36	
5	(United States) Brionna Jones	(Czech Basketball Federation) ZVVZ USK Praha	31	
6	(Spain) María Conde	(Czech Basketball Federation) ZVVZ USK Praha	33	
7	(United States) Chelsea Gray	(Turkish Basketball Federation) ÇBK Mersin Yenişehir Bld.	32	
8	(Belgium) Emma Meesseman	(Turkish Basketball Federation) Fenerbahçe	31	
9	(United States) Breanna Stewart	(Turkish Basketball Federation) Fenerbahçe	41	
10	(United States) Breanna Stewart (2)	(Turkey) Fenerbahçe	31	
10	(Puerto Rico) Arella Guirantes	(Hungary) Aluinvent DVTK Miskolc	31	
10	(England) Cheridene Green	(Hungary) Aluinvent DVTK Miskolc	31	
11	(United States) Megan Gustafson (3)	(Hellenic Basketball Federation) Olympiacos	37	
12	(Spain) Queralt Casas	(Spanish Basketball Federation) Valencia Basket	28	
13	(United States) Alyssa Thomas	(Czech Basketball Federation) ZVVZ USK Praha	28	
14	(Canada) Kayla Alexander	(French Federation of Basketball) Tango Bourges Basket	34	

Playoffs

Round	Player	Team	PIR	Ref.
1	(United States) Brionna Jones (2)	(Czech Basketball Federation) ZVVZ USK Praha	28	
2	(Spain) Raquel Carrera	(Spanish Basketball Federation) Valencia Basket	33	
3	(United States) Chelsea Gray (2)	(Turkish Basketball Federation) ÇBK Mersin Yenişehir Bld.	35	

=== MVP of the Month ===
Month	Player	Team	Ref.
2022
November	(United States) Alyssa Thomas	(Czech Basketball Federation) ZVVZ USK Praha	
December	(United States) Stephanie Mavunga	(Polish Basketball Federation) BC Polkowice	
2023
January	(Belgium) Emma Meesseman	(Turkish Basketball Federation) Fenerbahçe	
February	(Latvia) Kitija Laksa	(Italian Basketball Federation) Virtus Segafredo Bologna	
March	(Belgium) Emma Meesseman	(Turkish Basketball Federation) Fenerbahçe	

== Statistics ==
=== Individual statistics ===
==== Rating ====
Rank	Name	Team	Games	Rating	PIR
1.	(United States) Megan Gustafson	(Greece) Olympiacos	16	408	25.5
2.	(United States) Breanna Stewart	(Turkey) Fenerbahçe	11	279	25.4
3.	(United States) Alyssa Thomas	(Czech Republic) ZVVZ USK Praha	19	469	24.7

Source: FIBA EuroLeague Women

==== Points ====
Rank	Name	Team	Games	Points	PPG
1.	(United States) Megan Gustafson	(Greece) Olympiacos	16	361	22.6
2.	(United States) Breanna Stewart	(Turkey) Fenerbahçe	11	239	21.7
3.	(United States) Morgan Bertsch	(Belgium) Kangoeroes Basket Mechelen	14	242	17.3

Source: FIBA EuroLeague Women

==== Rebounds ====
Rank	Name	Team	Games	Rebounds	RPG
1.	(United States) Stephanie Mavunga	(Poland) BC Polkowice	11	137	12.5
2.	(United States) Alyssa Thomas	(Czech Republic) ZVVZ USK Praha	19	210	11.1
3.	(Chile) Ziomara Morrison	(Belgium) Kangoeroes Basket Mechelen	14	142	10.1

Source: FIBA EuroLeague Women

==== Assists ====
Rank	Name	Team	Games	Assists	APG
1.	(United States) Erica Wheeler	(Poland) BC Polkowice	10	74	7.4
2.	(Hungary) Ágnes Studer	(Hungary) KSC Szekszárd	13	84	6.5
3.	(United States) Chelsea Gray	(Poland) ÇBK Mersin Yenişehir Bld.	15	94	6.3

Source: FIBA EuroLeague Women

==== Blocks ====
Rank	Name	Team	Games	Blocks	BPG
1.	(United States) Elizabeth Williams	(Turkey) ÇBK Mersin Yenişehir Bld.	11	26	2.4
5.	(United States) Stephanie Mavunga	(Poland) BC Polkowice	11	21	1.9
3.	(Australia) Ezi Magbegor	(Hungary) Sopron Basket	16	28	1.8

Source: FIBA EuroLeague Women

==== Other statistics ====
Category	Player	Team	Games	Average
Steals	(United States) Alyssa Thomas	(Czech Republic) ZVVZ USK Praha	19	2.2
Turnovers	(Poland) Weronika Gajda	(Poland) BC Polkowice	14	4.8
Fouls drawn	(Hungary) Ágnes Studer	(Hungary) KSC Szekszárd	13	3.7
Minutes	(United States) Alyssa Thomas	(Czech Republic) ZVVZ USK Praha	19	36:16
FT %	(North Macedonia) DeWanna Bonner	(Turkey) ÇBK Mersin Yenişehir Bld.	12	91.5%
2-Point %	(Belgium) Emma Meesseman	(Turkey) Fenerbahçe	15	64.9%
3-Point %	(Germany) Marie Gülich	(Spain) Valencia Basket	16	51.5%

=== Team statistics ===
Category	Team	Average
Rating	(Turkey) Fenerbahçe	107.7
Points	(Turkey) Fenerbahçe	86.1
Rebounds	(Czech Republic) ZVVZ USK Praha	43.8
Assists	(Turkey) Fenerbahçe	23.7
Steals	(Turkey) Fenerbahçe	12.1
Blocks	(Spain) Valencia Basket	4.2
Turnovers	(Poland) BC Polkowice	17.9
FT %	(Hungary) KSC Szekszárd	81.4%
2-Point %	(Turkey) Fenerbahçe	51.6%
3-Point %	(Spain) Perfumerías Avenida	37.6%

== See also ==
- 2022–23 EuroCup Women
- 2022 FIBA Europe SuperCup Women
