= 2025 Turkish Women's Basketball Cup =

- Season: 2024–25
- Duration: 18–23 March 2025
- Games played: 7
- Teams: 8
- TV partner: TRT Spor Yıldız

Finals
- Champions: ÇBK Mersin (2nd title)
- Runners-up: Emlak Konut

Awards
- Final MVP: (Turkey) Teaira McCowan

The 2025 Turkish Women's Basketball Cup (Turkish: 2025 Basketbol Kadınlar Türkiye Kupası), also known as ING Kadınlar Türkiye Kupası for sponsorship reasons, was the 31st edition of Turkey's top-tier level professional women's domestic basketball cup competition. The quarterfinals of tournament were hold between 18 and 19 March 2025 in 4 different locations, followed by the semi-finals and the final held from 21 to 23 March 2025 at the Edirne Yeni Kapalı Spor Salonu in Edirne, Turkey.

== Qualified teams ==
The top eight placed teams after the first half of the top-tier level Women's Basketball Super League 2024–25 season qualified for the tournament. The four highest-placed teams played against the lowest-seeded teams in the quarter-finals. The competition will be played under a single elimination format.

Pos	Team	Pld	W	L	PF	PA	PD	Pts	Seeding
1	Fenerbahçe	11	11	0	963	733	+230	22	Seeded
2	Galatasaray	11	9	2	827	729	+98	20	Seeded
3	Emlak Konut	11	8	3	846	788	+58	19	Seeded
4	ÇBK Mersin	11	7	4	926	779	+147	18	Seeded
5	Beşiktaş	11	6	5	824	802	+22	17	Unseeded
6	Nesibe Aydın	11	6	5	860	864	−4	17	Unseeded
7	Botaş	11	4	7	812	864	−52	15	Unseeded
8	Tarsus Belediyesi	11	4	7	917	983	−66	15	Unseeded

Source: KBSL

== Draw ==
The 2025 Turkish Women's Basketball Cup was drawn on 24 December 2024. The seeded teams were paired in the quarterfinals with the non-seeded teams.

== Bracket ==
Quarterfinals; 18–19 March
1	Fenerbahçe	97
6	Nesibe Aydın	57
4	ÇBK Mersin	98
8	Tarsus Belediyesi	71
2	Galatasaray	67
5	Beşiktaş	81
3	Emlak Konut	86
7	Botaş	64

Semifinals; 21 March
1	Fenerbahçe	57
4	ÇBK Mersin	78
5	Beşiktaş	86
3	Emlak Konut	91

Final; 23 March
4	ÇBK Mersin	85
3	Emlak Konut	64

== Final ==
23 March 2025	ÇBK Mersin	85–64	Emlak Konut	Edirne
16:00 TRT (UTC+3)	Scoring by quarter: 27–13, 23–18, 24–15, 11–18
	Pts: McCowan 22; Rebs: Carleton 11; Asts: Anderson 8 PIR: Carleton 31	Boxscore	Pts: Macaulay, Ndour-Fall 17; Rebs: Ndour-Fall 10; Asts: three players 3 PIR: Ndour-Fall 26	Arena: Edirne Yeni Kapalı Spor Salonu; Referees: Tolga Akkuşoğlu, Turgut Işık, Hüseyin Çamcı

== See also ==
- 2024–25 Women's Basketball Super League
