= Çukurova Basketbol =

Turkish women's basketball team

ÇBK Mersin
- Leagues: Super League; EuroLeague Women
- Founded: 2017; 9 years ago
- History: Çukurova Basketbol (2017–2020); ÇBK Mersin Yenişehir Belediyesi (2020–2023); Çukurova Basketbol Kulübü Mersin (2023–2025); ÇİMSA ÇBK Mersin (2025–present)
- Arena: Servet Tazegül Arena
- Location: Mersin, Turkey
- Team colors: Black-Orange
- President: Serdar Çevirgen
- Head coach: Ceyhun Yıldızoğlu
- Team captain: Asena Yalçın
- Championships: 1 EuroCup Women; 2026; 2 Turkish Cups; 2022, 2025; 1 Turkish Presidential Cup; 2022
Home	Away

Former logo

Çukurova Basketbol Mersin (ÇBK Mersin), for sponsorship reasons ÇİMSA ÇBK Mersin, is a Turkish professional women's basketball club based in Mersin, Turkey. The club was founded in 2015 and currently competing in the Women's Basketball Super League.

== History ==
The club was founded in 2015 under the name Çukurova Basketbol Mersin. In 2020 the team was rebranded to ÇBK Mersin. They joined the Super League for the 2017–18 season. Grine had left the league prior to the beginning of the 2017 season. After competing in the play-off semi finals in their first season, the club played in the play-off finals against Fenerbahçe in the 2018–19 season. The club lost to Fenerbahçe in the finals, but qualified to compete in EuroLeague Women in the 2019–20 season.

On January 22, 2020, a partnership was established with the Yenişehir Municipality, and the club's name was changed to ÇBK Mersin Yenişehir Belediyesi. This partnership played a significant role in the club's rise.

Before the 2023-24 season, the name was changed to Çukurova Basketbol Kulübü Mersin (shortly Ç.B.K. Mersin). In late January 2025, as a result of the sponsorship agreement with ÇİMSA, the team's name became ÇİMSA ÇBK Mersin.

In the 2025–26 season, they achieved to win their first EuroCup title in history by defeating Greek side Athinaikos Qualco 160–157 in the finals.

== Current roster ==
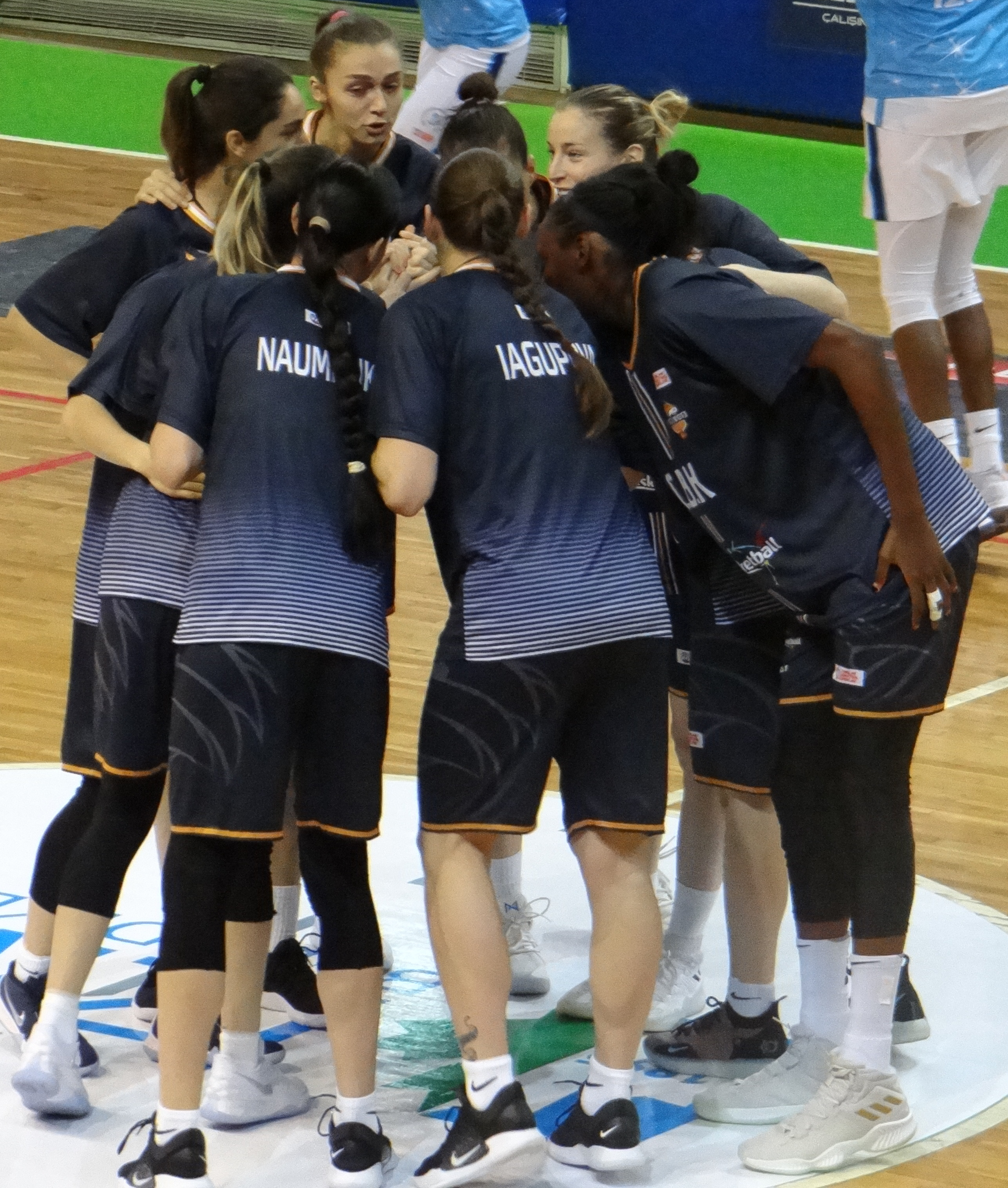
Çukurova Basketbol before the Turkish Super League game. (December 2018)

ÇBK Mersin roster
Players
Coaches

Pos.	No.	Nat.	Name	Ht.	Wt.	Age
G	0	(France)	Leite, Carla	1.75 m (5 ft 9 in)		22 – 16 April 2004
G	3	(Cameroon) (United States)	Thomas, Jessica	1.68 m (5 ft 6 in)		31 – 27 October 1994
PF	5	(Turkey)	Harma, Ayşenaz	1.88 m (6 ft 2 in)		18 – 22 November 2007
PG	6	(Turkey)	Akbaş, Büşra	1.75 m (5 ft 9 in)		31 – 8 March 1995
SF	7	(Turkey)	Küçük, Zümra	1.74 m (5 ft 9 in)		18 – 20 May 2008
F	10	(Turkey)	Ataş, Sinem (C)	1.85 m (6 ft 1 in)		31 – 1 January 1995
SF	14	(Turkey)	Erçelik, Azra			21 – 13 March 2005
G	22	(United States) (Turkey)	Burke, Kennedy	1.85 m (6 ft 1 in)		29 – 14 February 1997
SG	23	(Turkey)	Güler, Eslem	1.80 m (5 ft 11 in)		20 – 1 January 2006
C	29	(Ivory Coast)	Diaby, Kariata	1.93 m (6 ft 4 in)		31 – 29 June 1995
C	33	(Turkey)	Ural, Esra	1.98 m (6 ft 6 in)		35 – 18 August 1991
SG	35	(Turkey)	Güler, Eslem	1.80 m (5 ft 11 in)		20 – 1 January 2006
SG	44	(United Kingdom) (United States)	Samuelson, Karlie	1.83 m (6 ft 0 in)		31 – 10 May 1995
SG	45	(Ukraine)	Iagupova, Alina	1.86 m (6 ft 1 in)		34 – 9 February 1992

Head coach

- (Turkey) Ceyhun Yıldızoğlu

Assistant coach(es)

- (Turkey) Kadir Mert Oktay
- (Turkey) Mutlu Demir

Legend

- (C) Team captain
- Injured

- Roster
Updated: 30 September 2026

== Gallery ==
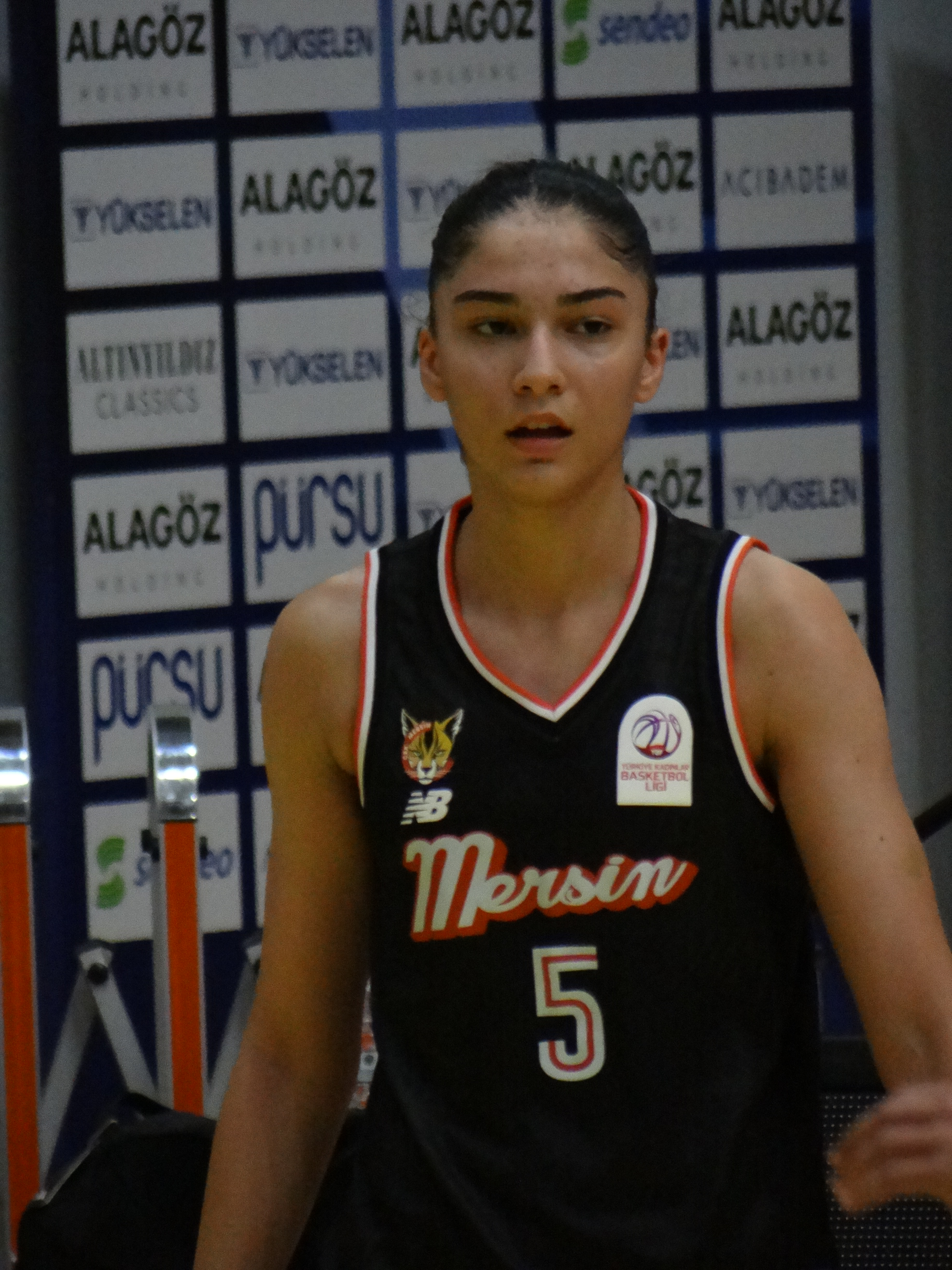
(5) Ayşenaz Harma

(6) Büşra Akbaş

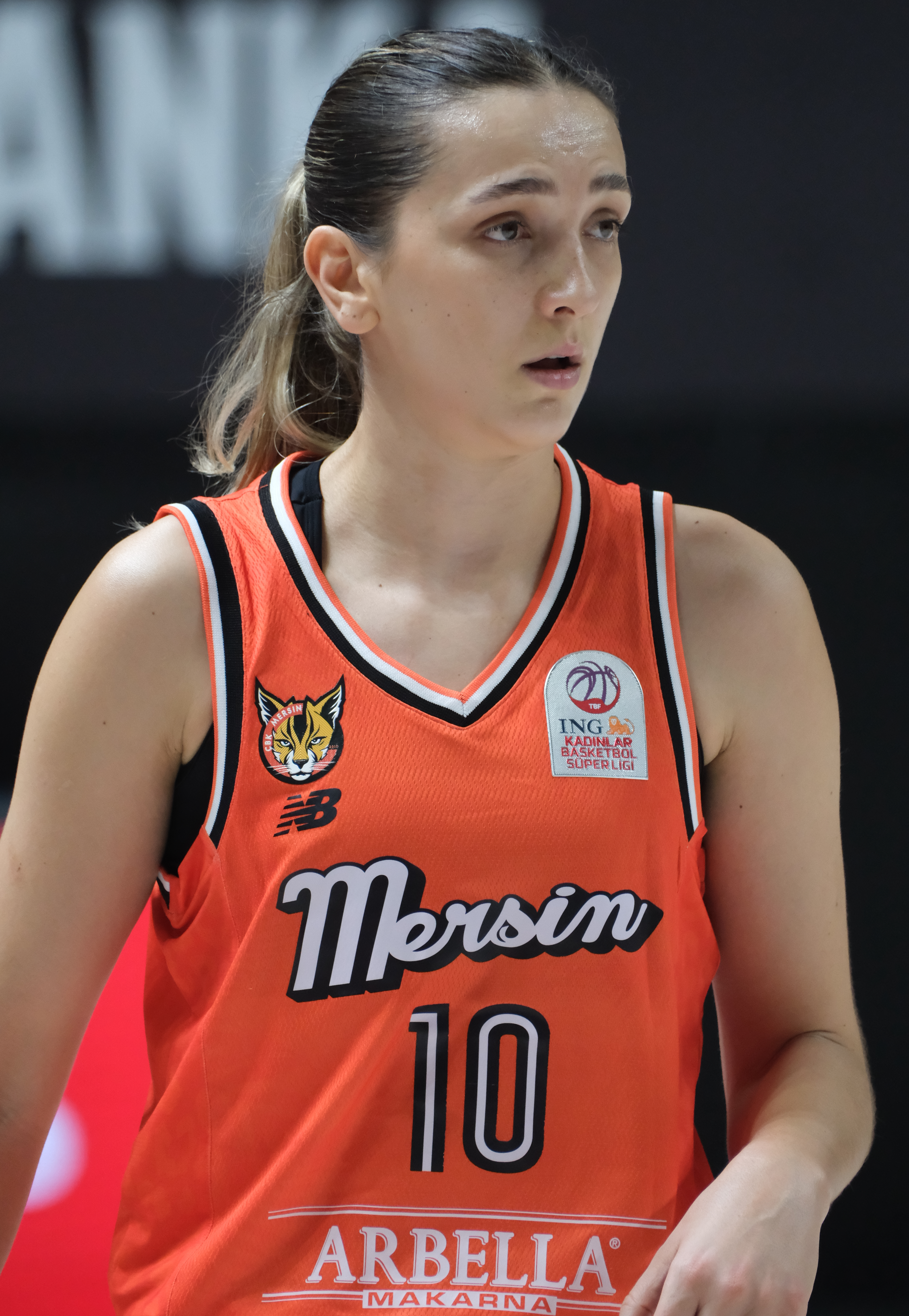
(10) Sinem Ataş

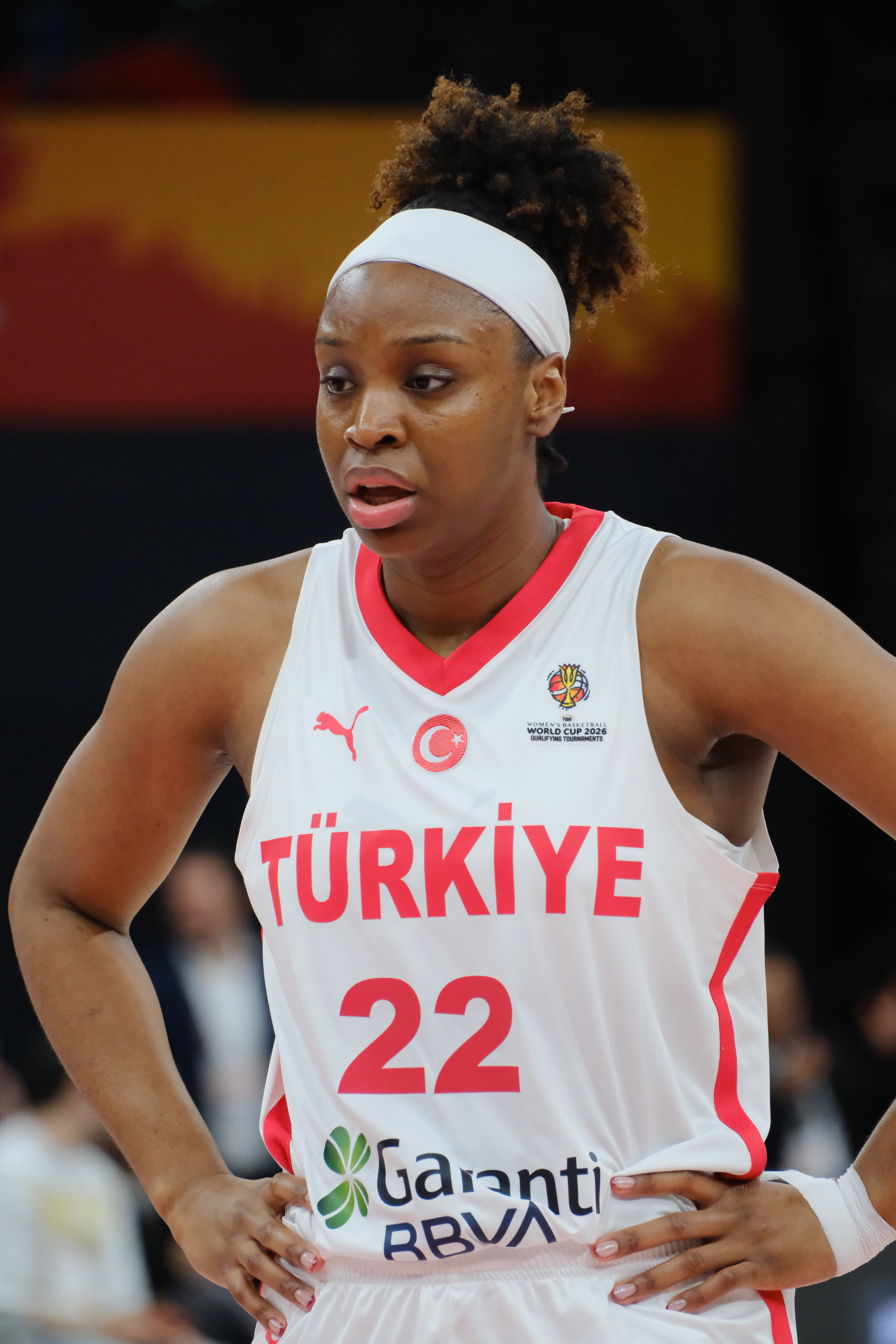
(22) Kennedy Burke

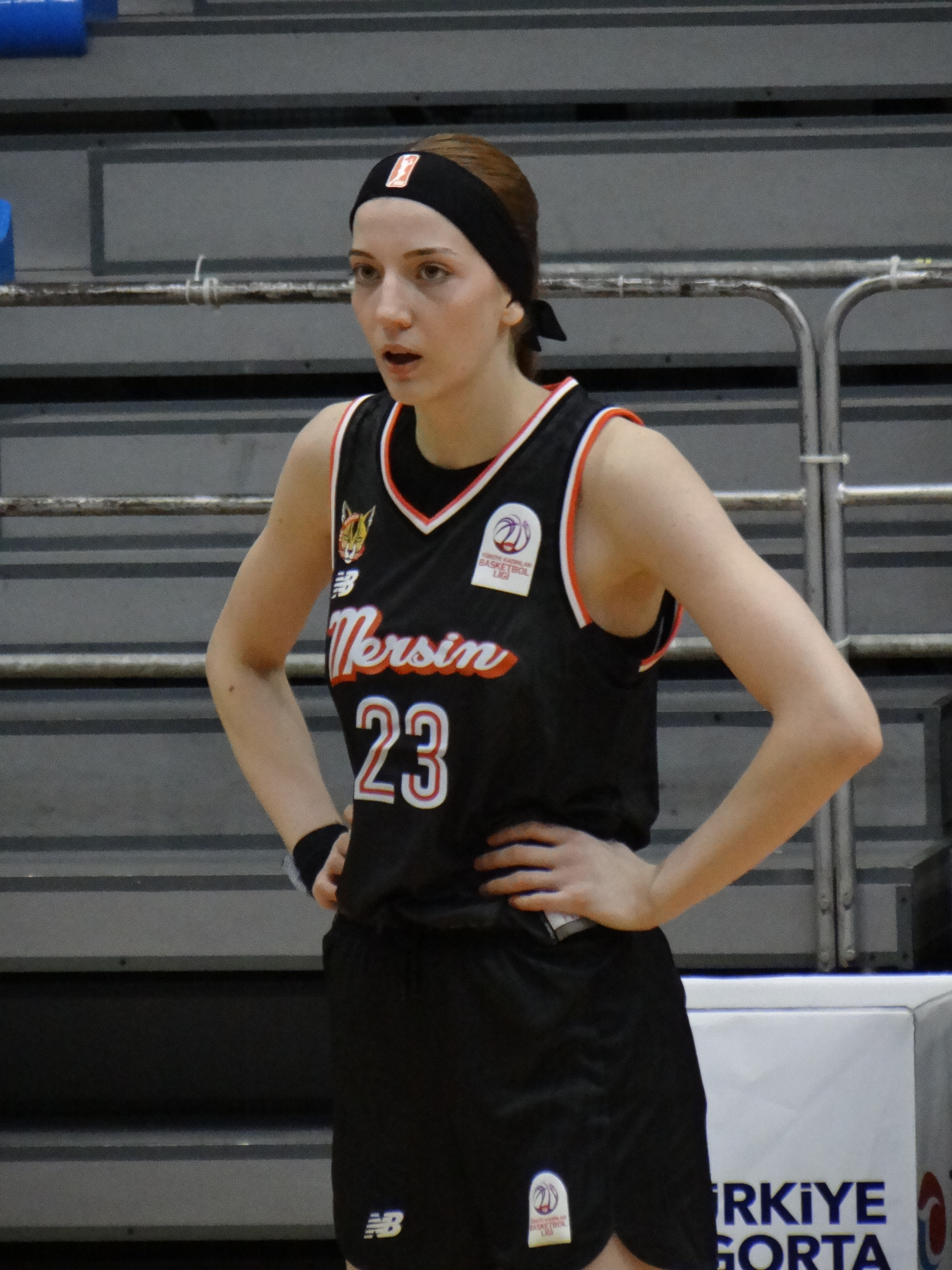
(23) Eslem Güler

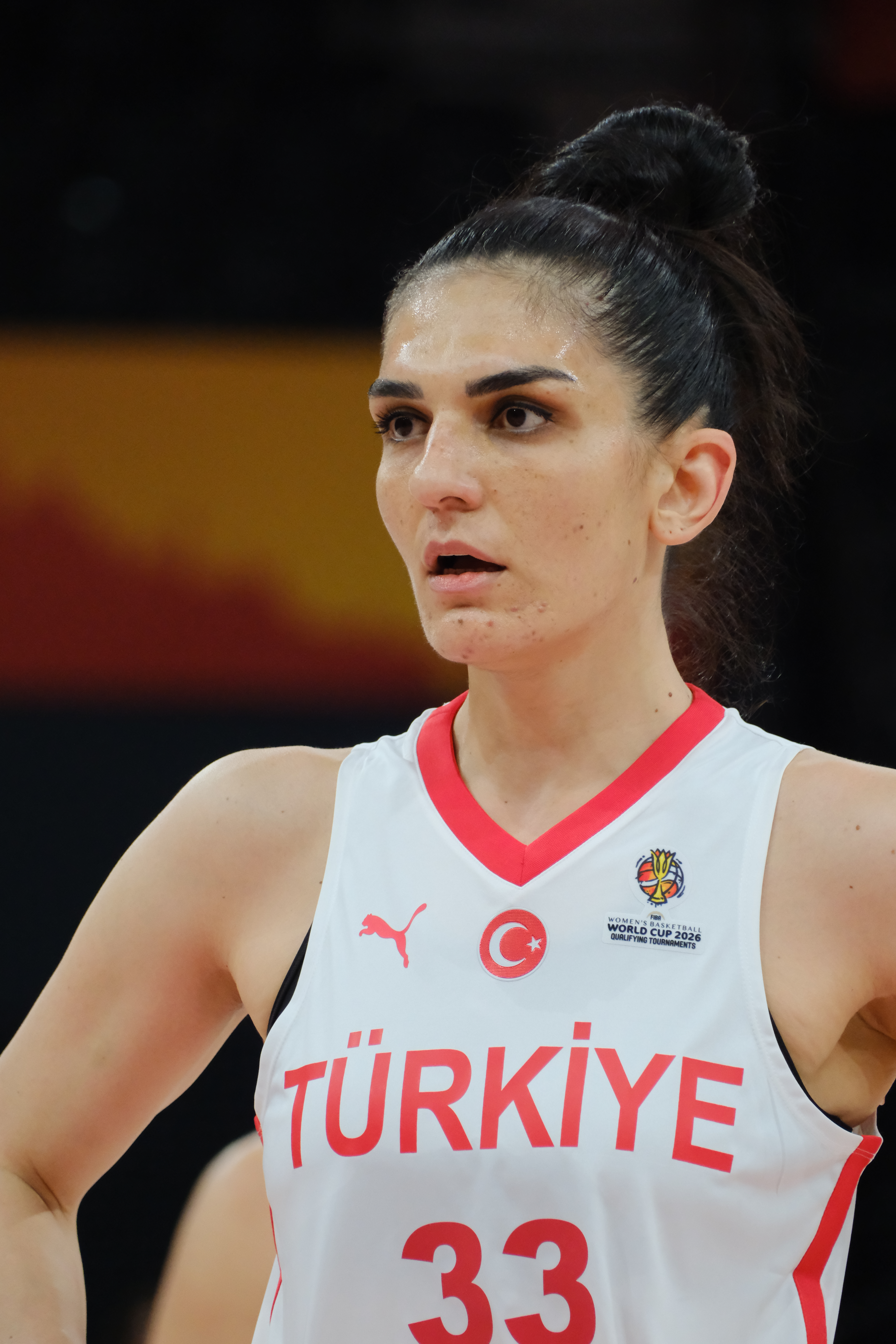
(33) Esra Ural

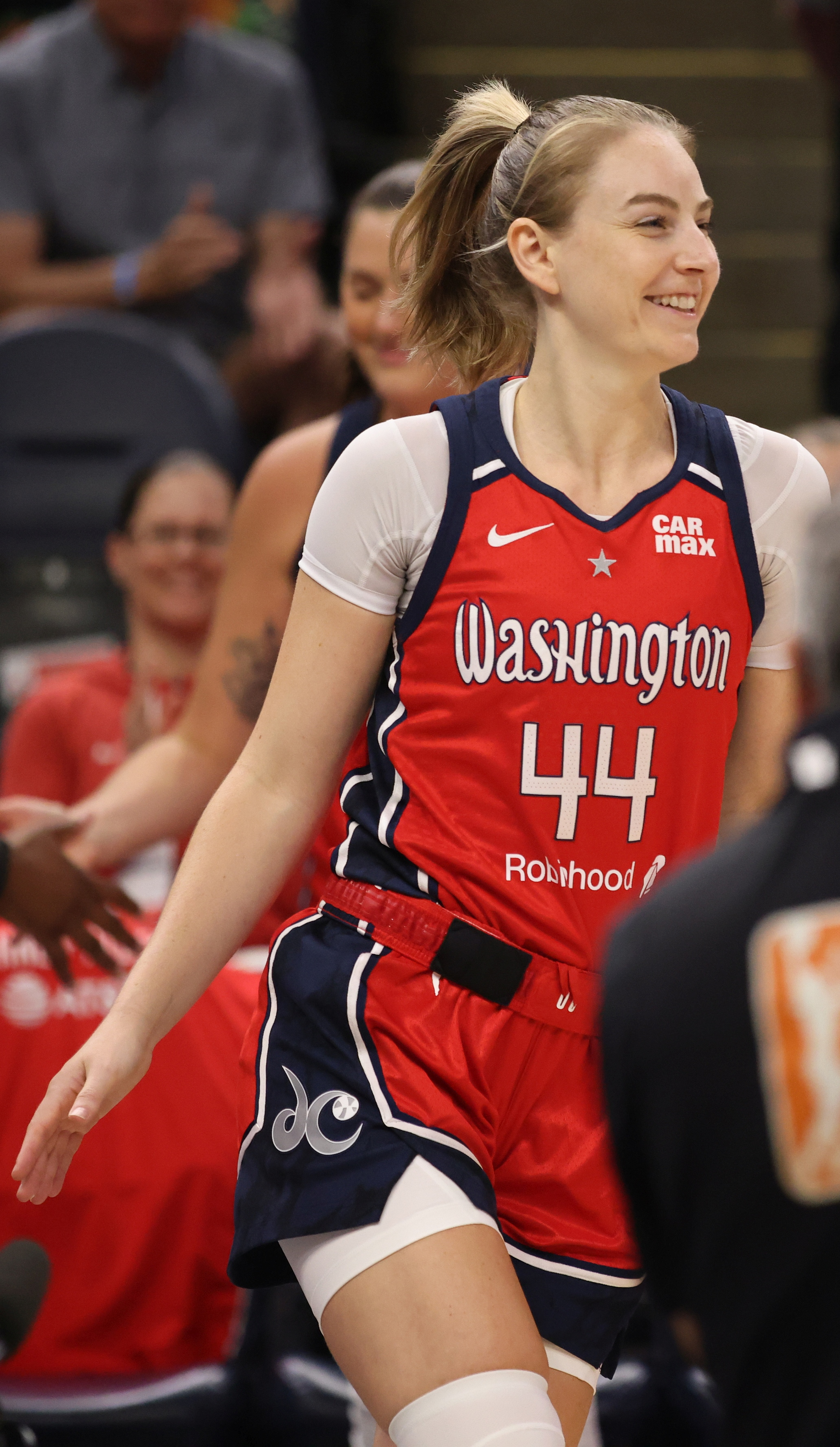
(44) Karlie Samuelson

(45) Alina Iagupova

Carla Leite

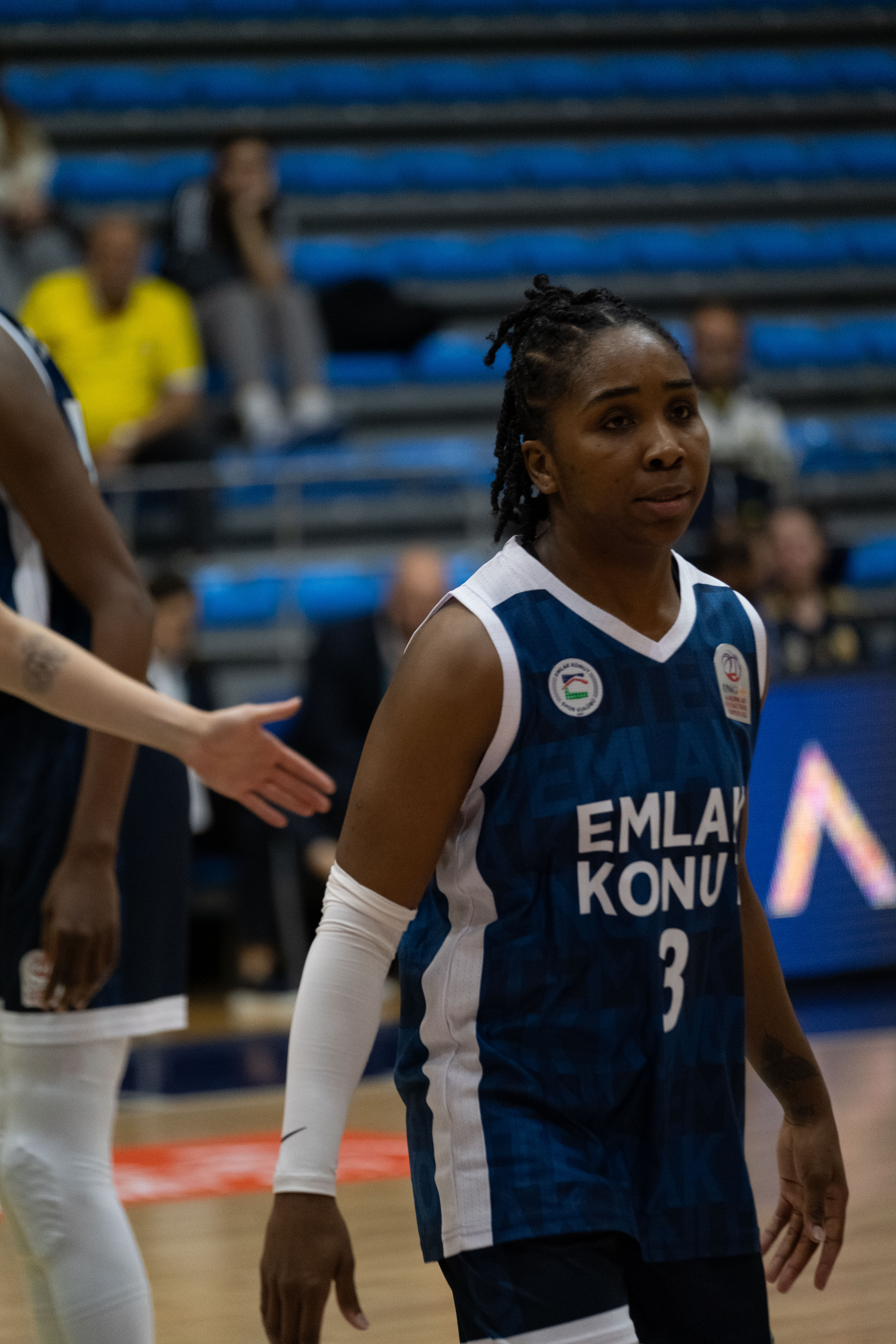
Jessica Thomas

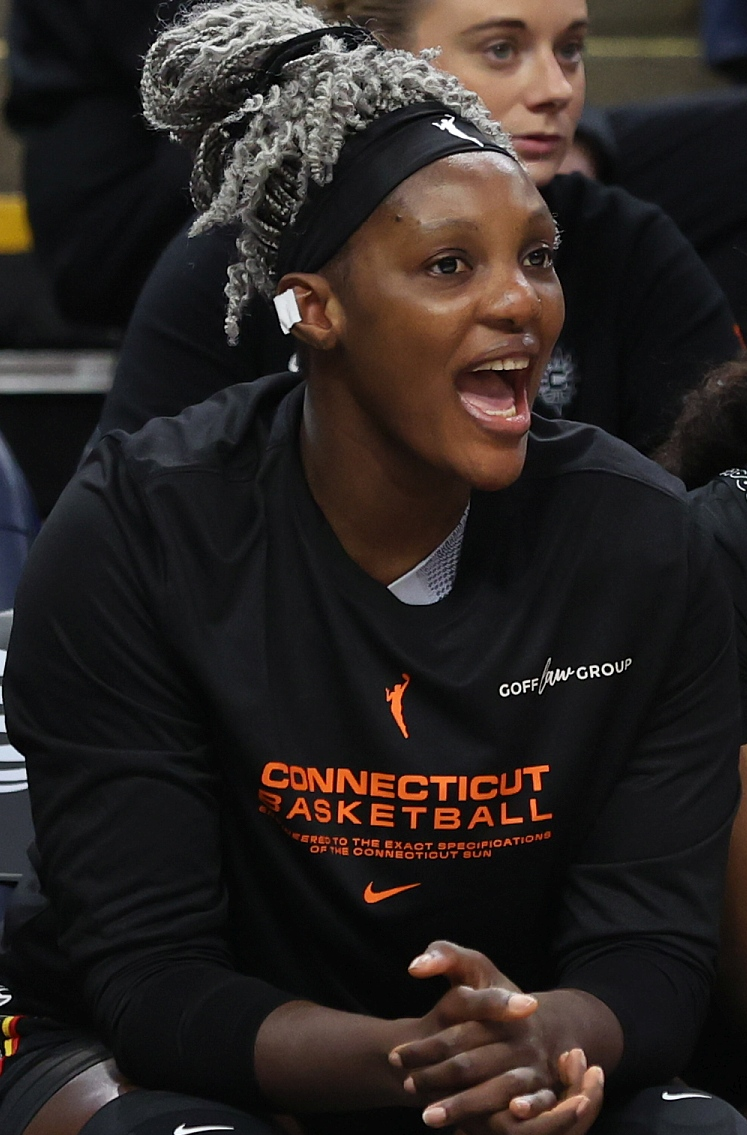
Kariata Diaby

== Honours ==
=== European competitions ===
- EuroLeague Women
  - Runners-up (2): 2022–23, 2024–25
- EuroCup Women
  - Winners (1): 2025–26
  - Fourth-place: 2021–22
  - Quarterfinalists: 2018–19

=== Domestic competitions ===
- Turkish Super League
  - Runners-up (5): 2018–19, 2021–22, 2022–23, 2023–24, 2024–25
  - Semifinalists: 2017–18
- Turkish Cup
  - Winners (2): 2022, 2025
  - Runners-up: 2024
- Turkish Women's Basketball Presidential Cup
  - Winners (1): 2022
  - Runners-up (3): 2019, 2024, 2025

== Notable players ==
Turkey

- Asena Yalçın
- Ayşenaz Harma
- Eslem Güler
- Esra Ural
- Gökşen Fitik
- Kennedy Burke (United States)
- Lara Sanders (United States)
- Manolya Kurtulmuş
- Meltem Avcı
- Pelin Bilgiç
- Sevgi Uzun
- Sinem Ataş
- Şaziye İvegin
- Quanitra Hollingsworth (United States)

United States

- Brittney Sykes
- Chelsea Gray
- Diamond DeShields
- Elizabeth Williams (Nigeria)
- Erlana Larkins
- Jantel Lavender
- Jasmine Thomas
- Kahleah Copper
- Kelsey Bone
- Lindsay Allen
- Marina Mabrey
- Morgan Tuck
- Nia Coffey
- Stephanie Mavunga

Azerbaijan

- Tiffany Hayes (United States)

Belarus

- Alex Bentley (United States)

Belgium

- Kim Mestdagh
- Julie Vanloo

Croatia

- Shavonte Zellous (United States)

France

- Iliana Rupert (Martinique) (Morocco)
- Olivia Epoupa (Cameroon)

Germany

Luisa Geiselsöder

Lithuania

- Laura Juškaitė
- Eglė Šventoraitė

North Macedonia

- DeWanna Bonner (United States)

Netherlands

- Laura Cornelius

Romania

- Gabriela Mărginean

Serbia

- Yvonne Anderson (United States)

Spain

- Astou Ndour (Senegal)
- Leonor Rodríguez
- María Araújo

Ukraine

- Alina Iagupova
- Liudmyla Naumenko

United Kingdom

- Karlie Samuelson (United States)
- Kristine Anigwe (United States)
- Temi Fagbenle (Nigeria) (United States)
