= TOBB Sport Hall =

Sport venue in Ankara, Turkey

TOBB Sport Hall TOBB Spor Salonu
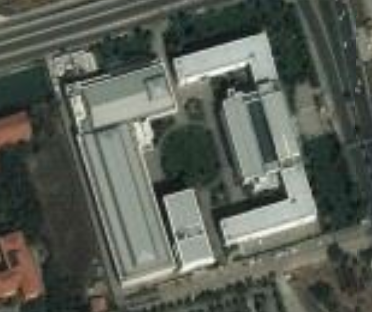
- Interactive map of TOBB Sport Hall; TOBB Spor Salonu
- Location: Söğütözü, Ankara, Turkey
- Coordinates: 39.920652°N 32.798339°E
- Owner: TOBB
- Capacity: 2,000

Construction
- Opened: 2007; 19 years ago

Tenant
- TED Ankara Kolejliler

TOBB Sport Hall (Turkish: TOBB Spor Salonu) is an indoor multi-purpose sport venue that is located in the TOBB University of Economics and Technology Söğütözü Campus, Ankara, Turkey. The hall, with a capacity for 2,000 spectators, was built in 2007. It is home to TED Ankara Kolejliler, which plays currently in the Turkish Basketball League.
