= Turkish Women's Basketball Cup =

- Current season, competition or edition: 2026 Turkish Women's Basketball Cup
- Sport: Basketball
- Founded: 1992
- No. of teams: 8
- Country: Turkey
- Confederation: FIBA Europe
- Most recent champion: Fenerbahçe (15th title)
- Most titles: Fenerbahçe (15 titles)
- Related competitions: Turkish Super League; Turkish Presidential Cup
- Website: TBF

The Turkish Women's Basketball Cup (Turkish: Basketbol Kadınlar Türkiye Kupası), also known as Halkbank Turkish Women's Basketball Cup for sponsporship reasons, is a basketball cup competition in Turkish basketball, run by the Turkish Basketball Federation since 1992. The current champions are Fenerbahçe, who are also the most successful team in the history of the competition, with 15 titles to their credit.

== Performance by club ==
Clubs in bold currently play in the top division.

Club	Winners	Runners-up	Years won
**Fenerbahçe**	15	6	1999, 2000, 2001, 2004, 2005, 2006, 2007, 2008, 2009, 2015, 2016, 2019, 2020, 2024, 2026
**Galatasaray**	11	6	1993, 1994, 1995, 1996, 1997, 1998, 2010, 2011, 2012, 2013, 2014
**Botaş**	2	2	2002, 2003
**ÇBK Mersin**	2	1	2022, 2025
Yakın Doğu Üniversitesi	2	0	2017, 2018
**Beşiktaş**	0	4	
Erdemirspor	0	2	
Brisaspor	0	2	
Adana ASKİ	0	2	
**Kayseri Basketbol**	0	1	
Hatay BŞB	0	1	
Istanbul University	0	1	
Migrosspor	0	1	
Urla Gençlik	0	1	
**Emlak Konut SK**	0	1	

== Finals ==
Season	Venue	Winners	Score	Runners-up	MVP	Ref.
1992–93	Kütahya	Galatasaray	74–51	Istanbul Üniversitesi	—N/a	
1993–94	Eskişehir	Galatasaray	75–62	Brisaspor	—N/a	
1994–95	Zonguldak	Galatasaray	74–50	Fenerbahçe	—N/a	
1995–96	Samsun	Galatasaray	109–72	Brisaspor	—N/a	
1996–97	Bolu	Galatasaray	98–57	Beşiktaş	—N/a	
1997–98	Kuşadası	Galatasaray	76–63	Urla Gençlik	—N/a	
1998–99	Balıkesir	Fenerbahçe	72–53	Galatasaray	—N/a	
1999–00	Alanya	Fenerbahçe	63–52	Galatasaray	—N/a	
2000–01	Istanbul	Fenerbahçe	57–53	Galatasaray	—N/a	
2001–02	Edirne	Botaş	89–68	Beşiktaş	—N/a	
2002–03	Çanakkale	Botaş	75–69	Erdemirspor	—N/a	
2003–04	Bursa	Fenerbahçe	58–46	Erdemirspor	—N/a	
2004–05	Diyarbakır	Fenerbahçe	73–71	Beşiktaş	—N/a	
2005–06	Kayseri	Fenerbahçe	70–68	Migrosspor	—N/a	
2006–07	İzmir	Fenerbahçe	90–63	Beşiktaş	—N/a	
2007–08	Adana	Fenerbahçe	62–51	Botaş	—N/a	
2008–09	Kayseri	Fenerbahçe	63–60	Galatasaray	—N/a	
2009–10	Balıkesir	Galatasaray	57–55	Fenerbahçe	—N/a	
2010–11	Gaziantep	Galatasaray	68–53	Tarsus Belediyespor	—N/a	
2011–12	Hatay	Galatasaray	76–72	Fenerbahçe	(United States) Sylvia Fowles	
2012–13	Antalya	Galatasaray	74–72	Fenerbahçe	(Spain) Sancho Lyttle	
2013–14	Ankara	Galatasaray	76–70	Fenerbahçe	(Turkey) Işıl Alben	
2014–15	Mersin	Fenerbahçe	81–67	Adana ASKİ	(United States) Tina Charles	
2015–16	Kayseri	Fenerbahçe	69–61	Galatasaray	(United States) Marissa Coleman	
2017	İzmir	Yakın Doğu Üniversitesi	77–61	AGÜ	(Turkey) Quanitra Hollingsworth	
2018	Mardin	Yakın Doğu Üniversitesi	86–79	Hatay BB	(United States) Courtney Vandersloot	
2019	Şanlıurfa	Fenerbahçe	60–53	Botaş	(United States) Kia Vaughn	
2020	Adana	Fenerbahçe	77–61	İzmit Belediyespor	(Turkey) Tuğçe Canıtez	
2021	Cancelled due to the COVID-19 pandemic.					
2022	Mersin	Çukurova Basketbol	71–58	Fenerbahçe	(United Kingdom) Temi Fagbenle	
2023	Cancelled after the 2023 Turkey–Syria earthquakes.					
2024	Balıkesir	Fenerbahçe	79–76	Çukurova Basketbol	(Belgium) Emma Meesseman	
2025	Edirne	ÇBK Mersin	85–64	Emlak Konut	(Turkey) Teaira McCowan	
2026	Denizli	Fenerbahçe	86–66	Galatasaray	(Belgium) Emma Meesseman	

== See also ==
- Men's
  - Turkish Men's Basketball League
  - Turkish Men's Basketball Cup
  - Turkish Men's Basketball Presidential Cup
- Women's
  - Turkish Women's Super League
  - Turkish Women's Basketball Cup
  - Turkish Women's Basketball Presidential Cup
