= Nesibe Aydın GSK =

Turkish women's basketball team

Nesibe Aydın Gençlik ve Spor Kulübü
- Leagues: Turkish Super League; EuroCup Women
- Founded: 2010; 16 years ago
- Arena: TOBB ETÜ Sports Hall
- Location: Ankara, Turkey
- Team colors: Green-Blue
- President: (Turkey) Mirkan Aydın
- Head coach: (Turkey) Fırat Okul
Home	Away

Nesibe Aydın Gençlik ve Spor Kulübü is a Turkish women's basketball club based in Ankara, Turkey. The club was founded in 2010 and currently competing in the Women's Basketball Super League.

== Current roster ==
Nesibe Aydın Gençlik ve Spor Kulübü roster
Players
Coaches

Pos.	No.	Nat.	Name	Ht.	Wt.	Age
PG	1	(Turkey)	Gürel, Tuğçe	1.71 m (5 ft 7 in)		19 – 21 April 2007
PG	3	(Bulgaria)	Ivanova, Gergana	1.75 m (5 ft 9 in)		27 – 22 September 1999
F	4	(Croatia)	Begić, Ana-Marija	1.90 m (6 ft 3 in)		32 – 17 January 1994
PF	5	(United States)	Nelson, Chelsea	1.88 m (6 ft 2 in)		30 – 25 June 1996
F	7	(Turkey)	Baran, Berfin	1.86 m (6 ft 1 in)		23 – 14 May 2003
SF	9	(Turkey)	Akgün, Büşra	1.83 m (6 ft 0 in)		33 – 9 June 1993
SF	10	(Turkey) (Germany)	Poyraz, Tuba	1.84 m (6 ft 0 in)		25 – 18 May 2001
PF	14	(Turkey)	Yılık, Şeyma	1.89 m (6 ft 2 in)		19 – 24 June 2007
SG	20	(Turkey)	Altunpa, Ceylin	1.74 m (5 ft 9 in)		23 – 1 January 2003
SG	23	(Turkey)	Önal, Yağmur	1.73 m (5 ft 8 in)		26 – 24 December 1999
C	28	(Turkey)	Güner, İlayda	1.92 m (6 ft 4 in)		26 – 5 November 1999
G	30	(United States)	Curry, Jayda	1.68 m (5 ft 6 in)		23 – 28 April 2003
F	15	(United States)	Beers, Raegan	1.93 m (6 ft 4 in)		23 – 23 July 2003

Head coach

- (Turkey) Fırat Okul

Assistant coach(es)

- (Turkey) Ahmet Gülen
- (Turkey) Safa Kaya

Legend

- (C) Team captain
- Injured

- Roster
Updated: 30 September 2026
