= OGM Ormanspor (women) =

- Leagues: Super League; EuroCup Women
- Founded: 1971; 55 years ago
- Arena: Sait Zarifoğlu Sports Hall
- Location: Ankara, Turkey
- Team colors: Dark green, light green, white
- President: (Turkey) Şahin Aybal
- Head coach: (Turkey) Emre Özsarı
Home	Away

OGM Ormanspor is a Turkish women's basketball club based in Ankara, Turkey. The club was founded in 1971 and currently competing in the Women's Basketball Super League.

The basketball team is part of the multi-sports club OGM Ormanspor.

== Current roster ==
Ormanspor roster
Players
Coaches

Pos.	No.	Nat.	Name	Ht.	Age
G	5	(Turkey)	Ülker, Asya	1.70 m (5 ft 7 in)	20 – 23 February 2006
SG	6	(Turkey)	Arı, Merve	1.79 m (5 ft 10 in)	28 – 5 January 1998
SF	7	(Turkey)	Orak, Aliye	1.85 m (6 ft 1 in)	18 – 4 June 2008
PG	11	(Australia)	Heal, Shyla	1.68 m (5 ft 6 in)	25 – 19 September 2001
F/C	12	(Turkey)	Şimşek, Banu	1.92 m (6 ft 4 in)	24 – 11 August 2002
PF	14	(United States)	Cooks, Sidney	1.93 m (6 ft 4 in)	27 – 15 November 1998
SF	18	(United States)	Brown, Jaelyn	1.85 m (6 ft 1 in)	27 – 12 October 1998
PG	19	(Turkey)	Erat, Kübra	1.70 m (5 ft 7 in)	31 – 12 February 1995
PG	30	(Turkey)	Yılmaz, Ayşe	1.71 m (5 ft 7 in)	23 – 13 August 2003
C	33	(United Kingdom) (United States)	Anigwe, Kristine	1.93 m (6 ft 4 in)	29 – 31 March 1997
C	44	(Turkey)	Torcu, Aysude	1.92 m (6 ft 4 in)	25 – 16 March 2001
SG	99	(Turkey)	Yaya, Derin	1.74 m (5 ft 9 in)	29 – 12 September 1997

Head coach

- (Turkey) Emre Özsarı

Assistant coach(es)

- (Turkey) Özgür Güvenç

Legend

- (C) Team captain
- Injured

- Roster
Updated: 30 September 2026

== Notable players ==
Turkey

- Gülşah Akkaya (1 season: '15-'16)
- Pelin Bilgiç (1 season: '19-'20)
- Alperi Onar (3 season: '16-'18, '20-'21)
- Özge Kavurmacıoğlu (1 season: '18-'19)
- Naile İvegin (2 season: '18-'20)

United States

- Brittney Sykes (2 season: '18, '20-'21)
- Jasmine Thomas (2 season: '14-'15, '17-'18)
- Arike Ogunbowale (1 season: '19-'20)
- Courtney Paris (1 season: '19-'20)
- Riquna Williams (1 season: '20-'21)
- Kahleah Copper (1 season: '18-'19)
- Tiffany Mitchell (1 season: '18-'19)
- Shatori Walker-Kimbrough (1 season: '17-'18)

Azerbaijan

- Aneika Henry (Jamaica) (1 season: '18-'19)

Croatia

- Luca Ivanković (1 season: '17-'18)

Czech Republic

- Petra Kulichová (1 season: '17-'18)

Montenegro

- Angel Robinson (United States) (2 season: '19-'21)

Slovakia

- Marie Růžičková (1 season: '18-'19)

United Kingdom

- Johannah Leedham (1 season: '19-'20)
