= Botaş SK =

Turkish sports club

Botaş Spor Kulübü
- Leagues: Super League
- Founded: 1984; 42 years ago
- Arena: DSİ Etlik Sports Hall
- Location: Ankara, Turkey
- President: Kerim Taşkıran
- Head coach: Cemal İlker Gözeneli
- Championships: 2 Turkish Super League: 2000–01, 2002–03; 2 Turkish Cup: 2001–02, 2002–03; 2 Turkish President Cup: 2002, 2003
- Website: www.botasspor.org.tr
Home	Away

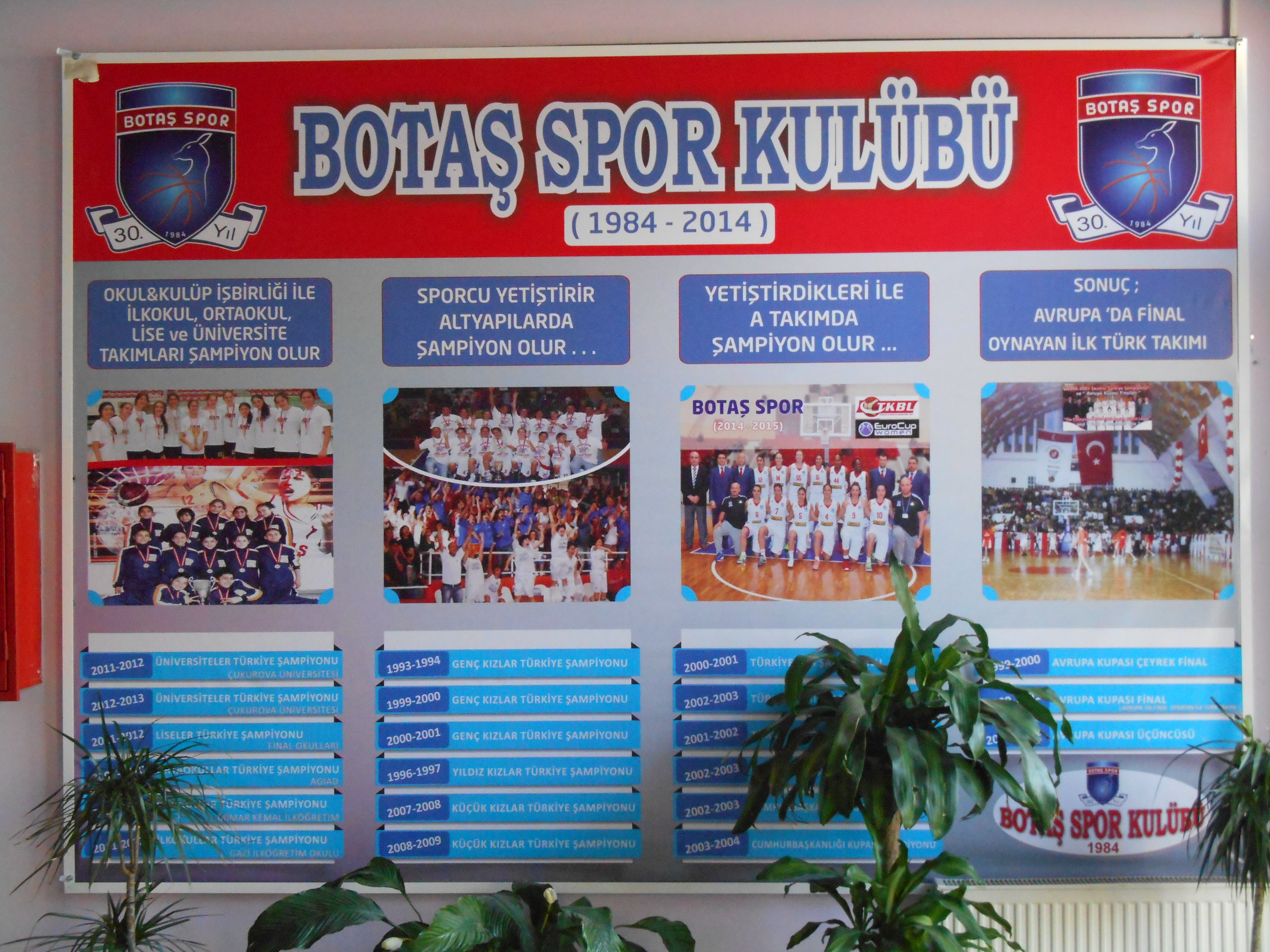
Club Honors Board (2014)

Botaş SK is a sports club based in Ankara, Turkey. The major branch of the club is the women's basketball, currently competing in the Turkish Women's Basketball Super League. The club also competes in athletics.

Botaş is the first Turkish club to play a final game in European women's basketball. The club was the runner-up at the Ronchetti Cup in 2001 and won the Turkish Super League and Cup titles twice. The home venue of the basketball team is DSİ Etlik Sports Hall.

Botaş SK was founded in 1984 and has been sponsored by Botaş Petroleum Pipeline Corporation since then. The club moved from Adana to Ankara in 2017.

== Current squad ==
BOTAŞ roster
Players
Coaches

Pos.	No.	Nat.	Name	Ht.	Age
PF	1	(Turkey)	Gül, Selin Rachel	1.89 m (6 ft 2 in)	22 – 21 December 2003
SF	2	(Turkey)	Acar, Nehi̇r	1.76 m (5 ft 9 in)	21 – 13 February 2005
G	3	(Turkey)	Güven, Işık Su	1.73 m (5 ft 8 in)	21 – 22 June 2005
G	4	(Turkey)	Demir, Begüm	1.75 m (5 ft 9 in)	18 – 4 February 2008
SF	5	(Turkey)	Berber, Mina	1.76 m (5 ft 9 in)	19 – 23 June 2007
SG	6	(Turkey)	Yeniçulha, İdil	1.73 m (5 ft 8 in)	20 – 29 March 2006
SG	7	(Turkey)	Özen, Duygu	1.70 m (5 ft 7 in)	25 – 20 March 2001
SF	9	(Turkey)	Çidal, Sehernaz	1.79 m (5 ft 10 in)	31 – 18 April 1995
SF	11	(Turkey)	Tokmak, Simge	1.84 m (6 ft 0 in)	23 – 23 January 2003
F/C	13	(Nigeria)	Akhator, Evelyn	1.90 m (6 ft 3 in)	31 – 3 February 1995
C	15	(Turkey)	Tokgöz, Aleyna	1.94 m (6 ft 4 in)	20 – 20 January 2006
G	22	(Turkey)	Çınar, Defne	1.64 m (5 ft 5 in)	18 – 23 February 2008
SG	23	(Czech Republic)	Holešínská, Petra	1.78 m (5 ft 10 in)	29 – 12 March 1997
G	24	(United States)	Clouden, Nia	1.75 m (5 ft 9 in)	26 – 17 May 2000
PF	25	(Turkey)	Eğin, Işılay	1.90 m (6 ft 3 in)	25 – 16 March 2001
G/F	31	(United States)	Nared, Jaime	1.88 m (6 ft 2 in)	31 – 14 September 1995

Head coach

- (Turkey) Cemal İlker Gözeneli

Assistant coach(es)

- (Turkey) Hüseyin Doğan
- (Turkey) Ozan Cankurt

Legend

- (C) Team captain
- Injured

- Roster
Updated: 18 September 2026

== Honors ==
=== International competitions ===
- Ronchetti Cup
  - Runners-up (1): 2000–2001
  - Quarter Finals (1): 1999–2000
- EuroCup
  - Eight Finals (3): 2006–2007, 2007–2008, 2009–2010

=== Domestic competitions ===
- Turkish Super League
  - Winners (2): 2000–2001, 2002–2003
  - Runners-up (3): 1992–1993, 1995–1996, 1996–1997
- Turkish Cup
  - Winners (2): 2001–2002, 2002–2003
- Turkish President Cup
  - Winners (2): 2003, 2004
  - Runner-up (2): 1993, 1997
