= 2025–26 EuroCup Women knockout stage =

EuroCup Women knockout season
- Season: 2025–26
- Dates: 11 December 2025 – 9 April 2026
- Games played: 62
- Teams: 32 (from 14 countries)

The 2025–26 EuroCup Women knockout stage details the matches played to decide the champion of the tournament. Games took place between the 11 December 2025 and 9 April 2026.

== Qualified teams ==
28 teams from the regular season advanced to knockout stage alongside four teams from the EuroLeague Women who dropped down to this tournament due to them finishing last in the first round of the EuroLeague Women.

=== Eliminated from EuroLeague Women ===
Group	Team
A	(Polish Basketball Federation) VBW Gdynia
B	(Hungarian Basketball Federation) Sopron Basket
C	(Hellenic Basketball Federation) Olympiacos SFP
D	(Turkish Basketball Federation) ÇİMSA ÇBK Mersin

=== Advanced from regular season ===
Group	Winners	Runners-up	Third place
A	(Italian Basketball Federation) Magnolia Basket Campobasso	(Czech Basketball Federation) Žabiny Brno	(Basketball Belgium) Castors Braine
B	(Polish Basketball Federation) LOTTO AZS UMCS Lublin	(Spanish Basketball Federation) Hozono Global Jairis	
C	(Hungarian Basketball Federation) NKA Universitas PEAC	(Spanish Basketball Federation) Lointek Gernika Bizkaia	(Israeli Basketball Association) Elitzur Ramla
D	(Basketball Belgium) Kangoeroes Basket Mechelen	(Italian Basketball Federation) GEAS Basket	
E	(Basketball Federation of Serbia) KKZ Crvena zvezda	(Turkish Basketball Federation) Emlak Konut SK	
F	(German Basketball Federation) Rutronik Stars Keltern	(Lithuanian Basketball Federation) Kibirkštis-TOKS	
G	(Spanish Basketball Federation) Perfumerias Avenida	(Hellenic Basketball Federation) Panathinaikos AC	
H	(French Federation of Basketball) BLMA	(Czech Basketball Federation) KP Brno	
I	(Spanish Basketball Federation) Movistar Estudiantes	(French Federation of Basketball) UFAB 49	(Romanian Basketball Federation) CS Rapid București
J	(Hellenic Basketball Federation) Athinaikos Qualco	(French Federation of Basketball) Charnay Basket	(Turkish Basketball Federation) Beşiktaş Boa
K	(Spanish Basketball Federation) Baxi Ferrol	(Polish Basketball Federation) MB Zagłębie Sosnowiec	
L	(French Federation of Basketball) Villeneuve-d'Ascq LM	(Polish Basketball Federation) Ślęza Wrocław	

== Seeding ==
The seeding was based on the results of the previous round. The four eliminated teams from the EuroLeague Women were pre-seeded into positions 1–4.

Seed	Grp	Team	Pld	W	L	PF	PA	PD	Pts	Qualification
1	D	(Turkish Basketball Federation) ÇİMSA ÇBK Mersin	6	1	5	399	444	−45	7	EuroLeague Women
2	C	(Hellenic Basketball Federation) Olympiacos SFP	6	1	5	383	533	−150	7	EuroLeague Women
3	B	(Hungarian Basketball Federation) Sopron Basket	6	0	6	368	507	−139	6	EuroLeague Women
4	A	(Polish Basketball Federation) VBW Gdynia	6	0	6	355	530	−175	6	EuroLeague Women
5	H	(French Federation of Basketball) BLMA	6	6	0	555	371	+184	12	First place
6	K	(Spanish Basketball Federation) Baxi Ferrol	6	6	0	553	373	+180	12	First place
7	C	(Hungarian Basketball Federation) NKA Universitas PEAC	6	6	0	481	335	+146	12	First place
8	F	(German Basketball Federation) Rutronik Stars Keltern	6	6	0	495	358	+137	12	First place
9	E	(Basketball Federation of Serbia) KKZ Crvena zvezda	6	6	0	489	398	+91	12	First place
10	L	(French Federation of Basketball) Villeneuve-d'Ascq LM	6	5	1	498	353	+145	11	First place
11	G	(Spanish Basketball Federation) Perfumerias Avenida	6	5	1	492	385	+107	11	First place
12	D	(Basketball Belgium) Kangoeroes Basket Mechelen	6	5	1	481	401	+80	11	First place
13	B	(Polish Basketball Federation) LOTTO AZS UMCS Lublin	6	5	1	456	379	+77	11	First place
14	J	(Hellenic Basketball Federation) Athinaikos Qualco	6	5	1	474	422	+52	11	First place
15	I	(Spanish Basketball Federation) Movistar Estudiantes	6	5	1	456	410	+46	11	First place
16	A	(Italian Basketball Federation) Magnolia Basket Campobasso	6	4	2	451	346	+105	10	First place
17	F	(Lithuanian Basketball Federation) Kibirkštis-TOKS	6	4	2	532	442	+90	10	Second place
18	L	(Polish Basketball Federation) Ślęza Wrocław	6	4	2	505	419	+86	10	Second place
19	B	(Spanish Basketball Federation) Hozono Global Jairis	6	4	2	441	364	+77	10	Second place
20	A	(Czech Basketball Federation) Žabiny Brno	6	4	2	456	387	+69	10	Second place
21	H	(Czech Basketball Federation) KP Brno	6	4	2	385	326	+59	10	Second place
22	E	(Turkish Basketball Federation) Emlak Konut SK	6	4	2	470	423	+47	10	Second place
23	I	(French Federation of Basketball) UFAB 49	6	4	2	470	431	+39	10	Second place
24	G	(Hellenic Basketball Federation) Panathinaikos AC	6	4	2	516	511	+5	10	Second place
25	K	(Polish Basketball Federation) MB Zagłębie Sosnowiec	6	4	2	433	448	−15	10	Second place
26	C	(Spanish Basketball Federation) Lointek Gernika Bizkaia	6	3	3	430	366	+64	9	Second place
27	D	(Italian Basketball Federation) GEAS Basket	6	3	3	427	389	+38	9	Second place
28	J	(French Federation of Basketball) Charnay Basket	6	3	3	453	454	−1	9	Second place
29	A	(Basketball Belgium) Castors Braine	6	4	2	443	397	+46	10	Third place
30	J	(Turkish Basketball Federation) Beşiktaş Boa	6	3	3	499	479	+20	9	Third place
31	C	(Israeli Basketball Association) Elitzur Ramla	6	3	3	413	405	+8	9	Third place
32	I	(Romanian Basketball Federation) CS Rapid București	6	3	3	425	423	+2	9	Third place

Source: FIBA
Rules for classification: 1) Points; 2) Points difference; 3) Points scored.

== Bracket ==
Play-off Round 1
32	(Romanian Basketball Federation) CS Rapid București	78	87	165
1	(Turkish Basketball Federation) ÇİMSA ÇBK Mersin	82	95	177
17	(Lithuanian Basketball Federation) Kibirkštis-TOKS	87	54	141
16	(Italian Basketball Federation) Magnolia Basket Campobasso	70	60	130
25	(Polish Basketball Federation) MB Zagłębie Sosnowiec	83	80	163
8	(German Basketball Federation) Rutronik Stars Keltern	75	79	154
24	(Hellenic Basketball Federation) Panathinaikos AC	85	69	154
9	(Basketball Federation of Serbia) KKZ Crvena zvezda	76	68	144
29	(Basketball Belgium) Castors Braine	80	91	171
4	(Polish Basketball Federation) VBW Gdynia	73	54	127
20	(Czech Basketball Federation) Žabiny Brno	51	81	132
13	(Polish Basketball Federation) LOTTO AZS UMCS Lublin	92	58	150
28	(French Federation of Basketball) Charnay Basket	63	55	118
5	(French Federation of Basketball) BLMA	55	70	125
21	(Czech Basketball Federation) KP Brno	66	69	135
12	(Basketball Belgium) Kangoeroes Basket Mechelen	72	85	157
31	(Israeli Basketball Association) Elitzur Ramla	86	80	166
2	(Hellenic Basketball Federation) Olympiacos SFP	93	75	168
18	(Polish Basketball Federation) Ślęza Wrocław	65	61	126
15	(Spanish Basketball Federation) Movistar Estudiantes	62	72	134
26	(Spanish Basketball Federation) Lointek Gernika Bizkaia	62	61	123
7	(Hungarian Basketball Federation) NKA Universitas PEAC	43	78	121
23	(French Federation of Basketball) UFAB 49	67	75	142
10	(French Federation of Basketball) Villeneuve-d'Ascq LM	95	67	162
30	(Turkish Basketball Federation) Beşiktaş Boa	106	59	165
3	(Hungarian Basketball Federation) Sopron Basket	90	80	170
19	(Spanish Basketball Federation) Hozono Global Jairis	75	51	126
14	(Hellenic Basketball Federation) Athinaikos Qualco	80	73	153
27	(Italian Basketball Federation) GEAS Basket	62	60	122
6	(Spanish Basketball Federation) Baxi Ferrol	81	66	147
22	(Turkish Basketball Federation) Emlak Konut SK	78	59	137
11	(Spanish Basketball Federation) Perfumerias Avenida	81	71	152

Round of 16
1	(Turkish Basketball Federation) ÇİMSA ÇBK Mersin	87	84	171
17	(Lithuanian Basketball Federation) Kibirkštis-TOKS	67	65	132
25	(Polish Basketball Federation) MB Zagłębie Sosnowiec	49	94	143
24	(Hellenic Basketball Federation) Panathinaikos AC	76	93	169
29	(Basketball Belgium) Castors Braine	67	59	126
13	(Polish Basketball Federation) LOTTO AZS UMCS Lublin	77	68	145
5	(French Federation of Basketball) BLMA	80	57	137
12	(Basketball Belgium) Kangoeroes Basket Mechelen	66	59	125
2	(Hellenic Basketball Federation) Olympiacos SFP	86	68	154
15	(Spanish Basketball Federation) Movistar Estudiantes	85	72	157
26	(Spanish Basketball Federation) Lointek Gernika Bizkaia	62	81	143
10	(French Federation of Basketball) Villeneuve-d'Ascq LM	85	83	168
3	(Hungarian Basketball Federation) Sopron Basket	72	61	133
14	(Hellenic Basketball Federation) Athinaikos Qualco	81	71	152
6	(Spanish Basketball Federation) Baxi Ferrol	58	57	115
11	(Spanish Basketball Federation) Perfumerias Avenida	86	79	165

Quarterfinals
1	(Turkish Basketball Federation) ÇİMSA ÇBK Mersin	91	71	162
24	(Hellenic Basketball Federation) Panathinaikos AC	87	57	144
13	(Polish Basketball Federation) LOTTO AZS UMCS Lublin	43	82	125
5	(French Federation of Basketball) BLMA	67	78	145
15	(Spanish Basketball Federation) Movistar Estudiantes	73	70	143
10	(French Federation of Basketball) Villeneuve-d'Ascq LM	71	80	151
14	(Hellenic Basketball Federation) Athinaikos Qualco	65	79	144
11	(Spanish Basketball Federation) Perfumerias Avenida	71	68	139

Semifinals
1	(Turkish Basketball Federation) ÇİMSA ÇBK Mersin	70	86	156
5	(French Federation of Basketball) BLMA	68	60	128
10	(French Federation of Basketball) Villeneuve-d'Ascq LM	56	78	134
14	(Hellenic Basketball Federation) Athinaikos Qualco	69	70	139

Final
1	(Turkish Basketball Federation) ÇİMSA ÇBK Mersin	85	75	160
14	(Hellenic Basketball Federation) Athinaikos Qualco	80	77	157

== Play-off Round 1 ==
=== Summary ===
The first legs were played on 10 and 11 December, and the second legs were played on 17 and 18 December 2025.

Team 1	Agg.	Team 2	1st leg	2nd leg
CS Rapid București (Romania)	165–177	(Turkey) ÇİMSA ÇBK Mersin	78–82	87–95
Kibirkštis-TOKS (Lithuania)	141–130	(Italy) Magnolia Basket Campobasso	87–70	54–60
MB Zagłębie Sosnowiec (Poland)	163–154	(Germany) Rutronik Stars Keltern	83–75	80–79
Panathinaikos AC (Greece)	154–144	(Serbia) KKZ Crvena zvezda	85–76	69–68
Castors Braine (Belgium)	171–127	(Poland) VBW Gdynia	80–73	91–54
Žabiny Brno (Czech Republic)	132–150	(Poland) LOTTO AZS UMCS Lublin	51–92	81–58
Charnay Basket (France)	118–125	(France) BLMA	63–55	55–70
KP Brno (Czech Republic)	135–157	(Belgium) Kangoeroes Basket Mechelen	66–72	69–85
Elitzur Ramla (Israel)	166–168	(Greece) Olympiacos SFP	86–93	80–75
Ślęza Wrocław (Poland)	126–134	(Spain) Movistar Estudiantes	65–62	61–72
Lointek Gernika Bizkaia (Spain)	123–121	(Hungary) NKA Universitas PEAC	62–43	61–78
UFAB 49 (France)	142–162	(France) Villeneuve-d'Ascq LM	67–95	75–67
Beşiktaş Boa (Turkey)	165–170	(Hungary) Sopron Basket	106–90	59–80
Hozono Global Jairis (Spain)	126–153	(Greece) Athinaikos Qualco	75–80	51–73
GEAS Basket (Italy)	122–147	(Spain) Baxi Ferrol	62–81	60–66
Emlak Konut SK (Turkey)	137–152	(Spain) Perfumerias Avenida	78–81	59–71

=== Matches ===
11 December 2025
19:00 (UTC+2)

Report

CS Rapid București (Romania)	78–82	(Turkey) ÇİMSA ÇBK Mersin
Scoring by quarter: 19–17, 16–12, 18–26, 25–27
Pts: Cuic 17; Rebs: Kostowicz 8 Asts: Cuic 6		Pts: Kurtulmuş, Juškaitė 18; Rebs: Juškaitė 9 Asts: Vanloo 7

Sala Rapid, Bucharest
Attendance: 252
Referees: Stylianos Simeonidis (GRE), Dimitar Georgiev (BUL), Romana Stojanović (CRO)

18 December 2025
19:00 (UTC+3)

Report

ÇİMSA ÇBK Mersin (Turkey)	95–87	(Romania) CS Rapid București
Scoring by quarter: 24–27, 24–20, 27–13, 20–27
Pts: Geiselsöder 24; Rebs: Geiselsöder 8 Asts: Vanloo 12		Pts: Cuic 27; Rebs: Cuic, Ghizila 4 Asts: Gödri-Părău 11

Servet Tazegül Arena, Mersin
Attendance: 3,000
Referees: Aleksandar Radonjić (AUT), Gilbert Hoxha (ALB), Elldin Uglari (KOS)

ÇİMSA ÇBK Mersin won the series 177–165 on aggregate

10 December 2025
19:00 (UTC+2)

Report

Kibirkštis-TOKS (Lithuania)	87–70	(Italy) Magnolia Basket Campobasso
Scoring by quarter: 27–12, 21–19, 28–25, 11–14
Pts: Nacickaitė 22; Rebs: Brown 8 Asts: Dean 7		Pts: Morrison 16; Rebs: Madera, Morrison 6 Asts: Giacchetti 4

Active Vilnius Arena, Vilnius
Attendance: 730
Referees: Elias Anttonen (FIN), Bogna Podkowińska (POL), Bjarki Þór Davíðsson (ISL)

17 December 2025
20:30 (UTC+1)

Report

Magnolia Basket Campobasso (Italy)	60–54	(Lithuania) Kibirkštis-TOKS
Scoring by quarter: 13–13, 18–14, 12–9, 17–18
Pts: Simon 17; Rebs: Gray 7 Asts: Makurat 5		Pts: Nacickaitė 20; Rebs: Labuckienė, Green 12; Asts: Dean 6

Molisana Arena, Campobasso
Attendance: 564
Referees: Jelena Tomić (CRO), Ivana Ivanović (SRB), Azra Mušić (SLO)

Kibirkštis-TOKS won the series 141–130 on aggregate

10 December 2025
18:00 (UTC+1)

Report

MB Zagłębie Sosnowiec (Poland)	83–75	(Germany) Rutronik Stars Keltern
Scoring by quarter: 17–10, 36–23, 10–28, 20–14
Pts: Taylor 22; Rebs: Reese 12; Asts: Tadić 11		Pts: Rosić 18; Rebs: Kiss-Rusk 9 Asts: Konstantinova 8

Hala Widowiskowo-Sportowa, Sosnowiec
Attendance: 150
Referees: Milita Stalaučinskaitė (LTU), Kristīne Simanoviča (LAT), Indrė Balnionytė-Gecevičienė (LTU)

17 December 2025
18:30 (UTC+1)

Report

Rutronik Stars Keltern (Germany)	79–80	(Poland) MB Zagłębie Sosnowiec
Scoring by quarter: 25–25, 20–17, 13–18, 21–20
Pts: Wilke 25; Rebs: Wilke 7 Asts: Kiss-Rusk 5		Pts: Taylor 35; Rebs: Reese 12; Asts: Tadić 6

Speiterlinghalle, Keltern
Attendance: 200
Referees: Yasmina Alcaraz (ESP), Pierre Landy (FRA), Irene Frossolini (ITA)

MB Zagłębie Sosnowiec won the series 163–154 on aggregate

11 December 2025
18:00 (UTC+2)

Report

Panathinaikos AC (Greece)	85–76	(Serbia) KKZ Crvena zvezda
Scoring by quarter: 14–14, 33–21, 19–26, 19–15
Pts: Fitzgerald 26; Rebs: Vītola 12; Asts: Krimili 6		Pts: Iagupova 18; Rebs: Fankam 6 Asts: Iagupova 6

Cholargos Sports Hall, Athens
Attendance: 520
Referees: Ciprian Stoica (ROU), Balázs Mészáros (HUN), Petr Blahout (CZE)

18 December 2025
18:00 (UTC+1)

Report

KKZ Crvena zvezda (Serbia)	68–69	(Greece) Panathinaikos AC
Scoring by quarter: 19–15, 15–18, 17–11, 17–25
Pts: Iagupova 16; Rebs: Fankam 14; Asts: Iagupova 6		Pts: Krimili 21; Rebs: Chatzileonti 11; Asts: Fitzgerald 4

FMP Hall Železnik, Belgrade
Attendance: 200
Referees: Alin Faur (ROU), Viktor Nagy (HUN), Dimitar Georgiev (BUL)

Panathinaikos AC won the series 154–144 on aggregate

10 December 2025
20:00 (UTC+1)

Report

Castors Braine (Belgium)	80–73	(Poland) VBW Gdynia
Scoring by quarter: 15–20, 17–17, 31–12, 17–24
Pts: Miller 19; Rebs: Kapenga 12; Asts: Ivanova 7		Pts: Wrzesiński 19; Rebs: Zalewska, Wrzesiński 5 Asts: Wrzesiński 4

Stade Gaston Reiff, Braine-l'Alleud
Attendance: 543
Referees: Pierre Landy (FRA), Irene Frosolini (ITA), Julien Malane (LUX)

17 December 2025
18:00 (UTC+1)

Report

VBW Gdynia (Poland)	54–91	(Belgium) Castors Braine
Scoring by quarter: 9–24, 15–15, 12–25, 18–27
Pts: Jones 13; Rebs: three players 4 Asts: Wrzesiński 6		Pts: Gaston 19; Rebs: Kapenga 10; Asts: Ivanova 7

Polsat Plus Arena, Gdynia
Attendance: 150
Referees: Sergii Zashchuk (UKR), Luka Manojlovic (SRB), Elias Anttonen (FIN)

Castors Braine won the series 171–127 on aggregate

11 December 2025
18:00 (UTC+1)

Report

Žabiny Brno (Czech Republic)	51–92	(Poland) LOTTO AZS UMCS Lublin
Scoring by quarter: 17–17, 9–33, 11–22, 14–20
Pts: Brown 11; Rebs: Evans 9 Asts: four players 2		Pts: Stanković 20; Rebs: Gatling 10; Asts: Slocum 5

Hala Rosnička, Brno
Attendance: 682
Referees: Mladen Lučić (MNE), Gregor Oprčkal (SLO), Frane Mjeda (CRO)

18 December 2025
18:00 (UTC+1)

Report

LOTTO AZS UMCS Lublin (Poland)	58–81	(Czech Republic) Žabiny Brno
Scoring by quarter: 18–24, 18–13, 7–28, 15–16
Pts: Gatling 18; Rebs: Gatling 8 Asts: Ryan 4		Pts: Spanou 20; Rebs: Hamzová 7 Asts: Záplatová 7

Hala MOSiR, Lublin
Attendance: 612
Referees: Joona Haaja (FIN), Oleksandr Oparin (UKR), Milita Stalaučinskaitė (LTU)

LOTTO AZS UMCS Lublin won the series 150–132 on aggregate

11 December 2025
20:00 (UTC+1)

Report

Charnay Basket (France)	63–55	(France) BLMA
Scoring by quarter: 17–8, 11–20, 19–13, 16–14
Pts: Thomas 24; Rebs: Thomas 7 Asts: Colas, Touré 4		Pts: Hoppie 18; Rebs: Rabot 12; Asts: Bernies 6

Salle Maurice Chevalier, Charnay-lès-Mâcon
Attendance: 600
Referees: Javier Torres Sánchez (ESP), Skirmantas Letukas (DEN), Aleksandar Radonjić (AUT)

18 December 2025
20:00 (UTC+1)

Report

BLMA (France)	70–55	(France) Charnay Basket
Scoring by quarter: 10–16, 15–19, 25–10, 20–10
Pts: Angloma 23; Rebs: Rabot 14; Asts: Bernies 8		Pts: Thomas 18; Rebs: Mayo 7 Asts: Daramy, Thomas 5

Palais des Sports de Lattes, Lattes
Attendance: 1,012
Referees: Esperanza Mendoza (ESP), Sandra Sánchez (ESP), Gavin Williams (GBR)

BLMA won the series 125–118 on aggregate

11 December 2025
18:00 (UTC+1)

Report

KP Brno (Czech Republic)	66–72	(Belgium) Kangoeroes Basket Mechelen
Scoring by quarter: 17–25, 12–13, 23–21, 14–13
Pts: Galíčková 15; Rebs: Galíčková 7 Asts: Svatoňová 6		Pts: Todd-Williams 23; Rebs: Todd-Williams, Nicholson 9 Asts: van den Adel, Nauwelaers 4

Vodova Sports Hall, Brno
Attendance: 321
Referees: Silvia Marziali (ITA), Viktor Nagy (HUN), Ewa Matuszewska (POL)

18 December 2025
20:30 (UTC+1)

Report

Kangoeroes Basket Mechelen (Belgium)	85–69	(Czech Republic) KP Brno
Scoring by quarter: 19–14, 21–25, 19–14, 26–16
Pts: Todd-Williams 24; Rebs: Nicholson 11; Asts: Todd-Williams 5		Pts: Žílová 18; Rebs: Svatoňová 6 Asts: Galíčková 5

Winketkaai, Mechelen
Attendance: 150
Referees: Igor Esteve Malmierca (AND), Julien Malane (LUX), Nace Mohorič (SLO)

Kangoeroes Basket Mechelen won the series 157–135 on aggregate

11 December 2025
19:00 (UTC+2)

Report

Elitzur Ramla (Israel)	86–93	(Greece) Olympiacos SFP
Scoring by quarter: 25–17, 15–22, 26–28, 20–26
Pts: Herbert-Harrigan, Guirantes 19; Rebs: Herbert-Harrigan, Guirantes 6 Asts: three players 4		Pts: Christinaki 23; Rebs: Johnson 10; Asts: Woolfolk 8

Peace and Friendship Stadium, Piraeus
Attendance: 20
Referees: Mikheil Vartanov (GEO), Nikola Perlić (CRO), Edison Gjoni (ALB)

18 December 2025
19:00 (UTC+2)

Report

Olympiacos SFP (Greece)	75–80	(Israel) Elitzur Ramla
Scoring by quarter: 17–24, 17–18, 21–24, 20–14
Pts: Woolfolk 23; Rebs: Woolfolk 7 Asts: Nikolopoulou, Woolfolk 4		Pts: Guirantes 17; Rebs: Herbert-Harrigan 7 Asts: Guirantes 6

Peace and Friendship Stadium, Piraeus
Attendance: 150
Referees: Sava Ćetković (MNE), Dumitru Stasiev (MDA), Gregor Oprčkal (SLO)

Olympiacos SFP won the series 168–166 on aggregate

11 December 2025
19:00 (UTC+1)

Report

Ślęza Wrocław (Poland)	65–62	(Spain) Movistar Estudiantes
Scoring by quarter: 24–15, 10–19, 17–9, 14–19
Pts: Strautmane 18; Rebs: Davis 13; Asts: Kraker, Kulińska 3		Pts: Bühner 15; Rebs: Ezeigbo 7 Asts: Etxarri, Camilión 4

KGHM Ślęza Arena, Breslavia
Attendance: 1100
Referees: Jan Baloun (CZE), Veronika Vávrová (CZE), Denys Povorozniuk (UKR)

18 December 2025
20:00 (UTC+1)

Report

Movistar Estudiantes (Spain)	72–61	(Poland) Ślęza Wrocław
Scoring by quarter: 21–17, 18–20, 19–17, 14–7
Pts: Berkani 27; Rebs: Bühner 12; Asts: Ezeigbo 7		Pts: Davis 18; Rebs: Davis 10; Asts: Fiszer 4

Polideportivo Antonio Magariños, Madrid
Attendance: 623
Referees: Tom de Lange (BEL), James Kerry Dominique (GIB), Jules Gaduel (FRA)

Movistar Estudiantes won the series 134–126 on aggregate

11 December 2025
20:00 (UTC+1)

Report

Lointek Gernika Bizkaia (Spain)	62–43	(Hungary) NKA Universitas PEAC
Scoring by quarter: 20–19, 11–7, 10–8, 21–9
Pts: Janković 17; Rebs: Adams 12; Asts: Olaeta 6		Pts: Török 12; Rebs: Török 8 Asts: Dúl 3

Maloste Sports Hall, Gernika-Lumo
Attendance: 213
Referees: James Kerry Dominique (GIB), Hugo Blanco Marques da Silva (POR), Josh Bowe (GBR)

17 December 2025
18:00 (UTC+1)

Report

NKA Universitas PEAC (Hungary)	78–61	(Spain) Lointek Gernika Bizkaia
Scoring by quarter: 21–16, 20–13, 18–15, 19–17
Pts: Reisingerová 25; Rebs: Tóth 8 Asts: Rátkai, Dúl 6		Pts: Janković 20; Rebs: Bessoir, Adams 6 Asts: Castedo, Adams 3

Lauber Dezső Sports Hall, Pécs
Attendance: 950
Referees: Domen Krajnc (SLO), Petr Blahout (CZE), Luka Brekalo (BIH)

Lointek Gernika Bizkaia won the series 123–121 on aggregate

10 December 2025
20:00 (UTC+1)

Report

UFAB 49 (France)	67–95	(France) Villeneuve-d'Ascq LM
Scoring by quarter: 16–24, 20–25, 17–28, 14–18
Pts: Ndjock 18; Rebs: Diarisso 12; Asts: Méndez 6		Pts: Fall 19; Rebs: Milapie 10; Asts: Peterson, Paget 5

Salle Jean Bouin, Angers
Attendance: 1098
Referees: Gavin Williams (GBR), Sandra Sánchez González (ESP), Chess van Looy (BEL)

17 December 2025
20:00 (UTC+1)

Report

Villeneuve-d'Ascq LM (France)	67–75	(France) UFAB 49
Scoring by quarter: 17–17, 14–20, 18–19, 18–19
Pts: Peterson 20; Rebs: four players 5 Asts: Peterson 5		Pts: Diarisso 19; Rebs: Méndez 7 Asts: Ndjock, Méndez 6

Le Palacium, Villeneuve-d'Ascq
Attendance: 1552
Referees: Kyriacos Christou (CYP), Jürgen Muho (LUX), Tom DeHondt (BEL)

Villeneuve-d'Ascq LM won the series 162–142 on aggregate

11 December 2025
20:00 (UTC+3)

Report

Beşiktaş Boa (Turkey)	106–90	(Hungary) Sopron Basket
Scoring by quarter: 28–26, 24–29, 30–13, 24–22
Pts: Fasoula 32; Rebs: Fasoula 14; Asts: Whitcomb 16		Pts: Wallack 18; Rebs: Wallack 10; Asts: Böröndy 9

BJK Akatlar Arena, Istanbul
Attendance: 357
Referees: Nataša Dragojević (MNE), Sónia Teixeira (POR), Primož Pipan (SLO)

18 December 2025
18:00 (UTC+1)

Report

Sopron Basket (Hungary)	80–59	(Turkey) Beşiktaş Boa
Scoring by quarter: 27–7, 18–17, 19–20, 16–15
Pts: Papp, Friškovec 21; Rebs: Friškovec, Fuehring 7 Asts: Papp 7		Pts: Milić 15; Rebs: Fasoula 13; Asts: Fasoula 4

Aréna Sopron, Sopron
Attendance: 900
Referees: Peter Ženiš (SVK), Branimir Galić (CRO), Vlad-Theodor Cotrobas-Dascalu (ROU)

Sopron Basket won the series 170–165 on aggregate

11 December 2025
20:30 (UTC+1)

Report

Hozono Global Jairis (Spain)	75–80	(Greece) Athinaikos Qualco
Scoring by quarter: 11–25, 18–19, 22–19, 24–17
Pts: López-Sénéchal 13; Rebs: Massey 7 Asts: Ayuso 6		Pts: Prince 25; Rebs: Prince 10; Asts: Hristova 4

Pabellón Fausto Vicent, Alcantarilla
Attendance: 812
Referees: Giacomo Dori (ITA), Tiago Roxo Perdigão (POR), Kirsten Poffé (BEL)

18 December 2025
20:45 (UTC+2)

Report

Athinaikos Qualco (Greece)	73–51	(Spain) Hozono Global Jairis
Scoring by quarter: 13–13, 22–16, 21–11, 17–11
Pts: Winterburn 14; Rebs: Tadić 11; Asts: Winterburn 10		Pts: Massey 14; Rebs: Massey 7 Asts: Ayuso 9

Dimitris Kaltsas Indoor Hall, Vyronas
Attendance: 200
Referees: Kirile Tvauri (GEO), Nermin Hodzić (GER), Tomasz Wit Langowski (POL)

Athinaikos Qualco won the series 153–126 on aggregate

10 December 2025
18:00 (UTC+1)

Report

GEAS Basket (Italy)	62–81	(Spain) Baxi Ferrol
Scoring by quarter: 18–16, 16–22, 19–22, 9–21
Pts: Scott 19; Rebs: Scott 7 Asts: Roumy, Attura 4		Pts: Millán, Daniels 15; Rebs: Daniels 8 Asts: Millán 6

PalaAllende, Milan
Attendance: 150
Referees: Laure Coanus (FRA), Nace Mohorič (SLO), Nemanja Vlahović (SRB)

18 December 2025
20:15 (UTC+1)

Report

Baxi Ferrol (Spain)	66–60	(Italy) GEAS Basket
Scoring by quarter: 14–15, 20–17, 16–16, 16–12
Pts: Joiner 15; Rebs: Rodríguez 8 Asts: Millán, Joiner 5		Pts: Scott 22; Rebs: Cornelie-Sigmundova 8 Asts: Scott 5

Polideportivo A Malata, Ferrol
Attendance: 1,397
Referees: Goran Grbić (SLO), Bogna Podkowińska (POL), Paulina Karolina Gajdosz (POL)

Baxi Ferrol won the series 147–122 on aggregate

11 December 2025
19:00 (UTC+3)

Report

Emlak Konut SK (Turkey)	78–81	(Spain) Perfumerias Avenida
Scoring by quarter: 19–19, 17–17, 14–21, 28–24
Pts: Thomas 24; Rebs: Ndour 11; Asts: Delaere 5		Pts: Soriano, Martín 17; Rebs: Cave 9 Asts: Soriano 6

Başakşehir Spor Kompleksi, Istanbul
Attendance: 400
Referees: Alin Faur (ROU), Amalia Marchiş (ROU), Marija Ćirić (SRB)

18 December 2025
20:30 (UTC+1)

Report

Perfumerias Avenida (Spain)	71–59	(Turkey) Emlak Konut SK
Scoring by quarter: 28–16, 15–12, 15–20, 13–11
Pts: Cave 18; Rebs: Arrojo 13; Asts: Martín 5		Pts: Thomas 18; Rebs: Sertoğlu 7 Asts: five players 1

Pabellón municipal de Würzburg, Salamanca
Attendance: 2,680
Referees: Skirmantas Letukas (DEN), Sara Månsson (SWE), Iain MacDonald (GBR)

Perfumerias Avenida won the series 152–137 on aggregate

== Round of 16 ==
=== Summary ===
The first legs were played on 14 and 15 January, and the second legs were played on 21 and 22 January 2026.

Team 1	Agg.	Team 2	1st leg	2nd leg
Kibirkštis-TOKS (Lithuania)	132–171	(Turkey) ÇİMSA ÇBK Mersin	67–87	65–84
MB Zagłębie Sosnowiec (Poland)	143–169	(Greece) Panathinaikos AC	49–76	94–93
Castors Braine (Belgium)	126–145	(Poland) LOTTO AZS UMCS Lublin	67–77	59–68
Kangoeroes Basket Mechelen (Belgium)	125–137	(France) BLMA	66–80	59–57
Movistar Estudiantes (Spain)	157–154	(Greece) Olympiacos SFP	85–86	72–68
Lointek Gernika Bizkaia (Spain)	143–168	(France) Villeneuve-d'Ascq LM	62–85	81–83
Athinaikos Qualco (Greece)	153–133	(Hungary) Sopron Basket	81–72	71–61
Perfumerias Avenida (Spain)	165–115	(Spain) Baxi Ferrol	86–58	79–57

=== Matches ===
15 January 2026
20:15 (UTC+2)

Report

Kibirkštis-TOKS (Lithuania)	67–87	(Turkey) ÇİMSA ÇBK Mersin
Scoring by quarter: 22–22, 20–20, 16–21, 9–24
Pts: Dean 18; Rebs: Dean 10; Asts: Dean 5		Pts: Geiselsöder 26; Rebs: Burke 14; Asts: Vanloo 8

Active Vilnius Arena, Vilnius
Attendance: 1,424
Referees: Veronika Obertová (SVK), Hrvoje Čavar (BIH), Veronika Vávrová (CZE)

22 January 2026
19:00 (UTC+3)

Report

ÇİMSA ÇBK Mersin (Turkey)	84–65	(Lithuania) Kibirkštis-TOKS
Scoring by quarter: 25–24, 26–14, 18–12, 15–15
Pts: Burke 20; Rebs: Burke 9 Asts: Vanloo 10		Pts: Aukštikalnytė, Ūsė 10; Rebs: Ūsė 6 Asts: Nacickaitė 5

Servet Tazegül Arena, Mersin
Attendance: 650
Referees: Yasmina Alcaraz (ESP), Laure Coanus (FRA), Branimir Galić (CRO)

ÇİMSA ÇBK Mersin won the series 171–132 on aggregate

14 January 2026
18:00 (UTC+1)

Report

MB Zagłębie Sosnowiec (Poland)	49–76	(Greece) Panathinaikos AC
Scoring by quarter: 17–26, 16–18, 12–10, 4–22
Pts: Taylor 17; Rebs: Jackowska 6 Asts: Micek 4		Pts: Fitzgerald 27; Rebs: Prince 18; Asts: Fitzgerald 7

Hala Widowiskowo-Sportowa, Sosnowiec
Attendance: 210
Referees: Goran Grbić (SLO), Elias Anttonen (FIN), Oleksandr Oparin (UKR)

21 January 2026
19:00 (UTC+2)

Report

Panathinaikos AC (Greece)	93–94	(Poland) MB Zagłębie Sosnowiec
Scoring by quarter: 25–24, 17–19, 20–23, 31–28
Pts: Prince 30; Rebs: Prince 15; Asts: Fitzgerald 9		Pts: Taylor 38; Rebs: Jackowska, Kurach 5 Asts: Taylor 6

Telekom Center Athens, Athens
Attendance: 7,829
Referees: Sónia Teixeira (POR), Ivana Ivanović (SRB), Aleksandar Radonjic (AUT)

MB Zagłębie Sosnowiec won the series 169–143 on aggregate

15 January 2026
20:00 (UTC+1)

Report

Castors Braine (Belgium)	67–77	(Poland) LOTTO AZS UMCS Lublin
Scoring by quarter: 15–27, 16–23, 20–19, 16–8
Pts: Gaston 15; Rebs: Miller 13; Asts: three players 3		Pts: Ryan 21; Rebs: Stanković 11; Asts: Wnorowska 4

Stade Gaston Reiff, Braine-l'Alleud
Attendance: 750
Referees: Joaquín García (ESP), Irene Frosolini (ITA), Aurimas Borusas (LTU)

22 January 2026
18:00 (UTC+1)

Report

LOTTO AZS UMCS Lublin (Poland)	68–59	(Belgium) Castors Braine
Scoring by quarter: 15–9, 22–22, 19–16, 12–12
Pts: Ryan 16; Rebs: Borkowska 7 Asts: Ryan 5		Pts: Gaston 13; Rebs: Gaston 8 Asts: Miller, Dupont 4

Hala MOSiR, Lublin
Attendance: 622
Referees: Viola Györgyi (NOR), Sara Månsson (SWE), Nemanja Vlahović (SRB)

LOTTO AZS UMCS Lublin won the series 145–126 on aggregate

15 January 2026
20:30 (UTC+1)

Report

Kangoeroes Basket Mechelen (Belgium)	66–80	(France) BLMA
Scoring by quarter: 22–18, 8–18, 20–17, 16–27
Pts: Nauwelaers 14; Rebs: Nicholson 13; Asts: Nauwelaers 7		Pts: Angloma 27; Rebs: Pospíšilová, Rabot 8 Asts: Rabot 4

Winketkaai, Mechelen
Attendance: 260
Referees: Alfonso Olivares Iglesias (ESP), Kristīne Simanoviča (LAT), Emma Perry (IRL)

22 January 2026
20:00 (UTC+1)

Report

BLMA (France)	57–59	(Belgium) Kangoeroes Basket Mechelen
Scoring by quarter: 17–13, 13–7, 13–21, 14–18
Pts: Angloma 12; Rebs: Breen 11; Asts: Angloma 5		Pts: Nauwelaers 16; Rebs: Nicholson 13; Asts: Nauwelaers 7

Palais des Sports de Lattes, Lattes
Attendance: 1,012
Referees: Esperanza Mendoza (ESP), Maria Ignatiou (CYP), Goran Grbić (SLO)

BLMA won the series 137–125 on aggregate

14 January 2026
20:00 (UTC+1)

Report

Movistar Estudiantes (Spain)	85–86	(Greece) Olympiacos SFP
Scoring by quarter: 21–19, 12–21, 30–15, 22–31
Pts: Bühner 24; Rebs: Bühner 12; Asts: Camilión 7		Pts: Woolfolk 21; Rebs: Jakubcová 5 Asts: Nikolopoulou 7

Polideportivo Antonio Magariños, Madrid
Attendance: 613
Referees: Valerio Grigioni (ITA), Diana Lapanović (SLO), Diogo Martins (POR)

22 January 2026
19:00 (UTC+2)

Report

Olympiacos SFP (Greece)	68–72	(Spain) Movistar Estudiantes
Scoring by quarter: 26–12, 19–18, 12–30, 11–12
Pts: Woolfolk 19; Rebs: Johnson 7 Asts: Woolfolk 7		Pts: Bühner 24; Rebs: Ezeigbo 11; Asts: Camilión 6

Peace and Friendship Stadium, Pireaus
Attendance: 200
Referees: Jelena Tomić (CRO), Ewa Matuszewska (POL), Suzana Vujičić (MNE)

Movistar Estudiantes won the series 157–154 on aggregate

15 January 2026
20:00 (UTC+1)

Report

Lointek Gernika Bizkaia (Spain)	62–85	(France) Villeneuve-d'Ascq LM
Scoring by quarter: 15–23, 15–23, 14–23, 18–16
Pts: Salvadores 13; Rebs: Adams 6 Asts: Salvadores 4		Pts: Fall 16; Rebs: Tahane 11; Asts: Tahane 6

Polideportivo Maloste, Guernica
Attendance: 249
Referees: Duhan Köyiçi (TUR), Ewa Matuszewska (POL), Nikola Bejat (NOR)

21 January 2026
20:00 (UTC+1)

Report

Villeneuve-d'Ascq LM (France)	83–81	(Spain) Lointek Gernika Bizkaia
Scoring by quarter: 28–21, 16–22, 18–18, 21–20
Pts: Fall 16; Rebs: Milapie 6 Asts: Peterson 9		Pts: Bessoir 24; Rebs: Polleros 6 Asts: three players 5

Le Palacium, Villeneuve-d'Ascq
Attendance: 1,550
Referees: Silvia Marziali (ITA), Veronika Vávrová (CZE), Tomasz Wit Łangowski (POL)

Villeneuve-d'Ascq LM won the series 168–143 on aggregate

15 January 2026
19:30 (UTC+2)

Report

Athinaikos Qualco (Greece)	81–72	(Hungary) Sopron Basket
Scoring by quarter: 26–21, 19–17, 17–17, 19–17
Pts: Parks 14; Rebs: Tadić 10; Asts: Winterburn, Pavlopoulou 5		Pts: Böröndy 19; Rebs: Fuehring 6 Asts: Papp 7

Dimitris Kaltsas Indoor Hall, Vyronas
Attendance: 356
Referees: Orhan Çağrı Hekimoğlu (TUR), Svetlana Stoyanova (BUL), Mikheil Vartanov (GEO)

22 January 2026
18:00 (UTC+1)

Report

Sopron Basket (Hungary)	61–71	(Greece) Athinaikos Qualco
Scoring by quarter: 20–22, 9–23, 17–9, 15–17
Pts: Böröndy 15; Rebs: Fuehring 9 Asts: Papp 5		Pts: Tadić, Parks 15; Rebs: Tadić, Prince 10; Asts: Pavlopoulou 7

Aréna Sopron, Sopron
Attendance: 950
Referees: Romana Stojanović (CRO), Nermin Hodzic (GER), Ciprian Stoica (ROU)

Athinaikos Qualco won the series 152–133 on aggregate

15 January 2026
20:30 (UTC+1)

Report

Perfumerías Avenida (Spain)	86–58	(Spain) Baxi Ferrol
Scoring by quarter: 23–16, 22–13, 16–11, 25–18
Pts: Martín 13; Rebs: Vilaró 8 Asts: Vilaró 5		Pts: Daniels 14; Rebs: Joiner 7 Asts: Rodríguez 3

Pabellón Würzburg-Silvia Domínguez, Salamanca
Attendance: 2,423
Referees: Maria Ignatiou (CYP), Nikola Perlić (CRO), Jan Baloun (CZE)

21 January 2026
20:15 (UTC+1)

Report

Baxi Ferrol (Spain)	57–79	(Spain) Perfumerías Avenida
Scoring by quarter: 16–21, 15–21, 13–24, 13–13
Pts: Melia 13; Rebs: Millán, Melia 6 Asts: Millán 4		Pts: Cave 18; Rebs: Kiss 8 Asts: Soriano 8

Polideportivo A Malata, Ferrol
Attendance: 1,317
Referees: Nataša Dragojević (MNE), Veronika Obertová (SVK), Ali Şakacı (TUR)

Perfumerías Avenida won the series 165–115 on aggregate

== Quarterfinals ==
=== Summary ===
The first legs were played on 5 February, and the second legs were played on 12 February 2026.

Team 1	Agg.	Team 2	1st leg	2nd leg
Panathinaikos AC (Greece)	144–162	(Turkey) ÇİMSA ÇBK Mersin	87–91	57–71
LOTTO AZS UMCS Lublin (Poland)	125–145	(France) BLMA	43–67	82–78
Movistar Estudiantes (Spain)	143–151	(France) Villeneuve-d'Ascq LM	73–71	70–80
Athinaikos Qualco (Greece)	144–139	(Spain) Perfumerias Avenida	65–71	79–68

=== Matches ===
5 February 2026
18:30 (UTC+2)

Report

Panathinaikos AC (Greece)	87–91	(Turkey) ÇİMSA ÇBK Mersin
Scoring by quarter: 19–28, 20–21, 26–27, 22–15
Pts: Spanou 21; Rebs: Spanou 12; Asts: Fitzgerald 8		Pts: Akbaş 21; Rebs: Iagupova 7 Asts: Burke 7

Telekom Center Athens, Athens
Attendance: 6,122
Referees: Gvidas Gedvilas (LTU), Ciprian Stoica (ROU), Gintaras Mačiulis (LTU)

12 February 2026
19:00 (UTC+3)

Report

ÇİMSA ÇBK Mersin (Turkey)	71–57	(Greece) Panathinaikos AC
Scoring by quarter: 19–16, 19–20, 20–10, 13–11
Pts: Burke 20; Rebs: Juškaitė 11; Asts: four players 4		Pts: Fitzgerald 24; Rebs: Prince 17; Asts: Fitzgerald, Spanou 4

Servet Tazegül Arena, Mersin
Attendance: 7,000
Referees: Ariadna Chueca (ESP), Nataša Dragojević (MNE), Mihkel Männiste (EST)

ÇİMSA ÇBK Mersin won the series 162–144 on aggregate

5 February 2026
18:00 (UTC+1)

Report

LOTTO AZS UMCS Lublin (Poland)	43–67	(France) BLMA
Scoring by quarter: 13–14, 6–21, 8–13, 16–19
Pts: Ryan, Wnoroska 8 Rebs: Ryan 9 Asts: Gatling 3		Pts: Hoppie, Rabot 15; Rebs: Rabot 15; Asts: Lambert 4

Hala MOSiR, Lublin
Attendance: 836
Referees: Veronika Obertová (SVK), Sandra Sánchez (ESP), Nikola Bejat (NOR)

12 February 2026
20:00 (UTC+1)

Report

BLMA (France)	78–82	(Poland) LOTTO AZS UMCS Lublin
Scoring by quarter: 24–23, 27–13, 9–26, 18–20
Pts: Angloma 28; Rebs: Cisse, Pospíšilová 5 Asts: Hoppie 6		Pts: Williams 19; Rebs: Borkowska, Stanković 7 Asts: Stanković 8

Palais des Sports de Lattes, Lattes
Attendance: 1,108
Referees: Sónia Teixeira (POR), Ivana Ivanović (SRB), Esperanza Mendoza (ESP)

BLMA won the series 145–125 on aggregate

5 February 2026
20:00 (UTC+1)

Report

Movistar Estudiantes (Spain)	73–71	(France) Villeneuve-d'Ascq LM
Scoring by quarter: 16–16, 24–19, 18–26, 15–10
Pts: Bühner 26; Rebs: Ezeigbo 9 Asts: Camilión 7		Pts: Peterson 21; Rebs: Fall 8 Asts: Peterson 4

Polideportivo Antonio Magariños, Madrid
Attendance: 876
Referees: Özlem Yalman (TUR), Nermin Hodzic (GER), Skirmantas Letukas (DEN)

12 February 2026
20:00 (UTC+1)

Report

Villeneuve-d'Ascq LM (France)	80–70	(Spain) Movistar Estudiantes
Scoring by quarter: 24–15, 17–21, 18–20, 21–14
Pts: Peterson 27; Rebs: Fall 10; Asts: Tahane 4		Pts: Berkani Bühner 21; Rebs: Bühner 9 Asts: Camilión 6

Le Palacium, Villeneuve-d'Ascq
Attendance: 2,100
Referees: Çisil Güngör (TUR), Jelena Tomić (CRO), Sara Månsson (SWE)

Villeneuve-d'Ascq LM won the series 151–143 on aggregate

5 February 2026
20:30 (UTC+2)

Report

Athinaikos Qualco (Greece)	65–71	(Spain) Perfumerías Avenida
Scoring by quarter: 17–18, 20–18, 10–27, 18–8
Pts: Hristova 21; Rebs: Tadić 9 Asts: Pavlopoulou 4		Pts: Martín 22; Rebs: Kiss 10; Asts: Martín 8

Dimitris Kaltsas Indoor Hall, Vyronas
Attendance: 500
Referees: Ivana Ivanović (SBR), Zoran Mitrovski (MKD), Viktor Nagy (HUN)

12 February 2026
20:30 (UTC+1)

Report

Perfumerías Avenida (Spain)	68–79	(Greece) Athinaikos Qualco
Scoring by quarter: 22–14, 17–26, 19–17, 10–22
Pts: Meyers 14; Rebs: Meyers, Takács-Kiss 4 Asts: Martín 3		Pts: Prince 18; Rebs: Parks 8 Asts: Prince, Winterburn 4

Pabellón Würzburg-Silvia Domínguez, Salamanca
Attendance: 2,749
Referees: Silvia Marziali (ITA), Özlem Yalman (TUR), Suzana Vujičić (MNE)

Athinaikos Qualco won the series 144–139 on aggregate

== Semifinals ==
=== Summary ===
The first legs were played on 26 February, and the second legs were played on 4 March 2026.

Team 1	Agg.	Team 2	1st leg	2nd leg
BLMA (France)	128–156	(Turkey) ÇİMSA ÇBK Mersin	68–70	60–86
Athinaikos Qualco (Greece)	139–134	(France) Villeneuve-d'Ascq LM	69–56	70–78

=== Matches ===
26 February 2026
20:00 (UTC+1)

Report

BLMA (France)	68–70	(Turkey) ÇİMSA ÇBK Mersin
Scoring by quarter: 21–20, 15–20, 16–14, 16–16
Pts: Cissé, Breen 12; Rebs: Rabot 7 Asts: Rabot 7		Pts: Burke 16; Rebs: Geiselsöder, Burke 7 Asts: Allen 8

Palais des Sports de Lattes, Lattes
Attendance: 1,192
Referees: Kirile Tvauri (GEO), Skirmantas Letukas (DEN), Sara Månsson (SWE)

4 March 2026
19:00 (UTC+3)

Report

ÇİMSA ÇBK Mersin (Turkey)	86–60	(France) BLMA
Scoring by quarter: 13–18, 20–14, 27–16, 26–12
Pts: Šventoraitė, Burke 19; Rebs: Šventoraitė 10; Asts: Allen 7		Pts: Breen 15; Rebs: Rabot 8 Asts: Bernies 4

Servet Tazegül Arena, Mersin
Attendance: 6,000
Referees: Sónia Teixeira (POR), Łukasz Jankowski (POL), Nemanja Ninković (SRB)

ÇİMSA ÇBK Mersin won the series 156–128 on aggregate

26 February 2026
20:30 (UTC+2)

Report

Athinaikos Qualco (Greece)	69–56	(France) Villeneuve-d'Ascq LM
Scoring by quarter: 12–19, 13–13, 19–12, 16–12
Pts: Prince 16; Rebs: Tadić 8 Asts: Tadić 5		Pts: Tahane 13; Rebs: Tahane 10; Asts: Alston, Tahane 2

Dimitris Kaltsas Indoor Hall, Vyronas
Attendance: 500
Referees: Esperanza Mendoza (ESP), Nikola Perlić (CRO), Ewa Matuszewska (POL)

4 March 2026
20:00 (UTC+1)

Report

Villeneuve-d'Ascq LM (France)	78–70	(Greece) Athinaikos Qualco
Scoring by quarter: 18–17, 14–15, 22–18, 24–20
Pts: Alston 18; Rebs: Chery 8 Asts: Peterson 8		Pts: Prince 24; Rebs: Prince 9 Asts: Pavlopoulou 5

Le Palacium, Villeneuve-d'Ascq
Attendance: 1,980
Referees: Ivana Ivanović (SRB), Zdenko Tomasović (SVK), Jan Baloun (CZE)

Athinaikos Qualco won the series 139–134 on aggregate

== Final ==
=== Summary ===
The first leg was played on 2 April, and the second leg was played on 9 April 2026.

Team 1	Agg.	Team 2	1st leg	2nd leg
Athinaikos Qualco (Greece)	157–160	(Turkey) ÇİMSA ÇBK Mersin	80–85	77–75

=== Matches ===
2 April 2026
20:30 (UTC+3)

Report

Athinaikos Qualco (Greece)	80–85	(Turkey) ÇİMSA ÇBK Mersin
Scoring by quarter: 16–29, 26–19, 20–23, 18–14
Pts: Anigwe 18; Rebs: Anigwe 10; Asts: Winterburn 6		Pts: Burke 25; Rebs: Burke 9 Asts: Allen, Iagupova 6

Dimitris Kaltsas Indoor Hall, Vyronas
Attendance: 2,100
Referees: Ariadna Chueca (ESP), Juozas Barkauskas (LTU), Valentin Oliot (FRA)

Starters:			Pts	Reb	Ast
PG	8	(Greece) Pinelopi Pavlopoulou	9	5	3
SG	7	(United Kingdom) Holly Winterburn	2	1	6
SF	23	(United States) Alexis Prince	11	3	1
PF	24	(United States) Robyn Parks	17	6	1
C	15	(France) Ana Tadić	3	0	1
Reserves:					
F	1	(Serbia) Ivana Raca	0	0	0
PG	3	(Greece) Elena Tsineke	0	0	0
G	5	(Greece) Evdokia Stamati	DNP		
SF	11	(United States) Diamond Miller	13	2	2
C	13	(Greece) Vasiliki Louka	2	3	0
C	33	(United States) Kristine Anigwe	18	10	1
G	45	(Bulgaria) Borislava Hristova	5	3	1
Head coach:
(Hellenic Basketball Federation) Styliani Kaltsidou

Athinaikos	Mersin

Athinaikos	Statistics	Mersin
26/51 (51%)	2-point field goals	21/38 (55.3%)
4/19 (21.1%)	3-point field goals	11/23 (47.8%)
16/24 (66.7%)	Free throws	10/11 (90.9%)
16	Offensive rebounds	6
23	Defensive rebounds	27
39	Total rebounds	33
16	Assists	22
5	Steals	3
6	Turnovers	10
0	Blocks	4
15	Fouls	21

Starters:			Pts	Reb	Ast
PG	35	(Belgium) Julie Vanloo	0	1	5
SG	16	(United States) Lindsay Allen	16	2	6
SF	22	(Turkey) Kennedy Burke	25	9	0
PF	45	(Ukraine) Alina Iagupova	6	6	6
C	14	(Lithuania) Eglė Šventoraitė	8	3	0
Reserves:					
G	3	(Turkey) Manolya Kurtulmuş	DNP		
PG	6	(Turkey) Büşra Akbaş	9	1	1
G	8	(Turkey) Asena Yalçın	DNP		
F	10	(Turkey) Sinem Ataş	0	1	0
F	12	(Lithuania) Laura Juškaitė	17	2	3
C	18	(Germany) Luisa Geiselsöder	DNP		
C	33	(Turkey) Esra Ural	4	5	1
Head coach:
(Turkish Basketball Federation) Ekrem Memnun

9 April 2026
20:00 (UTC+3)

Report

ÇİMSA ÇBK Mersin (Turkey)	75–77	(Greece) Athinaikos Qualco
Scoring by quarter: 18–20, 20–23, 23–18, 14–16
Pts: Allen 20; Rebs: Juškaitė 8 Asts: Allen 9		Pts: Prince 18; Rebs: Winterburn 8 Asts: Winterburn 6

Servet Tazegül Arena, Mersin
Attendance: 7,200
Referees: Esperanza Mendoza (ESP), Ventsislav Velikov (BUL), Siniša Prpa (SRB)

Starters:			Pts	Reb	Ast
PG	35	(Belgium) Julie Vanloo	8	1	1
SG	16	(United States) Lindsay Allen	20	1	9
SF	22	(Turkey) Kennedy Burke	17	7	0
PF	45	(Ukraine) Alina Iagupova	10	1	4
C	14	(Lithuania) Eglė Šventoraitė	10	4	0
Reserves:					
G	3	(Turkey) Manolya Kurtulmuş	DNP		
PG	6	(Turkey) Büşra Akbaş	0	0	1
G	8	(Turkey) Asena Yalçın	DNP		
F	10	(Turkey) Sinem Ataş	0	1	0
F	12	(Lithuania) Laura Juškaitė	8	8	1
C	18	(Germany) Luisa Geiselsöder	DNP		
C	33	(Turkey) Esra Ural	2	2	0
Head coach:
(Turkish Basketball Federation) Ekrem Memnun

Mersin	Athinaikos

Mersin	Statistics	Athinaikos
23/40 (57.5%)	2-point field goals	21/42 (50%)
4/21 (19.1%)	3-point field goals	6/21 (28.6%)
17/19 (89.5%)	Free throws	17/20 (85%)
11	Offensive rebounds	13
23	Defensive rebounds	24
34	Total rebounds	37
16	Assists	19
6	Steals	10
14	Turnovers	14
2	Blocks	2
19	Fouls	21

2025–26 EuroCup Women champions

ÇİMSA ÇBK Mersin
(1st title)

Starters:			Pts	Reb	Ast
PG	8	(Greece) Pinelopi Pavlopoulou	2	3	0
SG	7	(United Kingdom) Holly Winterburn	9	8	6
SF	23	(United States) Alexis Prince	18	6	2
PF	24	(United States) Robyn Parks	12	2	3
C	33	(United States) Kristine Anigwe	14	7	3
Reserves:					
F	1	(Serbia) Ivana Raca	2	5	0
PG	3	(Greece) Elena Tsineke	14	2	4
G	5	(Greece) Evdokia Stamati	DNP		
SF	11	(United States) Diamond Miller	0	0	0
C	13	(Greece) Vasiliki Louka	0	0	0
C	15	(France) Ana Tadić	4	2	1
G	45	(Bulgaria) Borislava Hristova	2	1	0
Head coach:
(Hellenic Basketball Federation) Styliani Kaltsidou

== Matchday reports ==
Reference
Play-Off Round 1 - First leg
Play-Off Round 1 - Second leg
Round of 16 - First leg
Round of 16 - Second leg
Quarter-finals - First leg
Quarter-finals - Second leg
Semi-finals - First leg
Semi-finals - Second leg
Final - First leg
Final - Second leg

== See also ==
- 2025–26 EuroLeague Women
- 2025–26 EuroLeague Women regular season
- 2025–26 EuroLeague Women qualification round
- 2025–26 EuroCup Women
- 2025 FIBA Europe SuperCup Women
- 2025–26 EuroCup Basketball
