= List of 2021 WNBA season transactions =

This is a list of transactions that have taken place during the off-season and the 2021 WNBA season.

== Retirement ==
| Date | Name | Team(s) played (years) | Age | Notes | Ref. |
|---|---|---|---|---|---|
| February 8, 2021 | (United States) Crystal Langhorne | Washington Mystics (2008–2013); Seattle Storm (2014–2020) | 34 | WNBA Champion (2018, 2020); WNBA All-Star (2011, 2013); WNBA Most Improved Player (2009); Also played overseas in Slovakia, Hungary, China & Australia. | |
| February 9, 2021 | (United States) Renee Montgomery | Minnesota Lynx (2009, 2015–2017); Connecticut Sun (2010–2014); Seattle Storm (2015); Atlanta Dream (2018–2019) | 34 | WNBA Champion (2015, 2017); WNBA All-Star (2011); WNBA Sixth Woman of the Year (2012); Also played overseas in Lithuania, Israel, Russia, Australia, and Poland. | |
| February 9, 2021 | (United States) LaToya Sanders | Phoenix Mercury (2008); Minnesota Lynx (2009); Los Angeles Sparks (2011); Washington Mystics (2012, 2015-2020) | 34 | WNBA Champion (2019) | |
| March 15, 2021 | (United States) Morgan Tuck | Connecticut Sun (2016–2019); Seattle Storm (2020) | 26 | WNBA Champion (2020) | |
| May 13, 2021 | (United States) Seimone Augustus | Minnesota Lynx (2006–2019); Los Angeles Sparks (2020) | 37 | 4 × WNBA Champion (2011, 2013, 2015, 2017); 8 × WNBA All-Star (2006, 2007, 2011, 2013–2015, 2017, 2018); WNBA Finals MVP (2011); WNBA Rookie of the Year (2006) | |

== Front office movements ==
=== Head coach changes ===
Off-season

| Departure date | Team | Outgoing head coach | Reason for departure | Hire date | Incoming head coach | Last coaching position | Ref. |
|---|---|---|---|---|---|---|---|
| October 15, 2020 | Dallas Wings | (United States) Brian Agler | Mutual agreement | December 9 | (United States) Vickie Johnson | Las Vegas Aces assistant coach (2018–2020) | |
| May 3, 2021 | Atlanta Dream | (United States) Nicki Collen | Hired as head coach by Baylor University | May 3 | (United States) Mike Petersen (interim) | Atlanta Dream assistant coach (2018–2020) | |

== Player movement ==
=== Trades ===
February
| February 5 | To Washington Mystics: (United States) Erica McCall | To Minnesota Lynx: 2022 third-round pick |
| February 10 | To Phoenix Mercury: (Canada) Kia Nurse; (United States) Megan Walker | To New York Liberty: 2021 first-round pick (#6); 2022 first-round pick |
| February 10 | To New York Liberty: (United States) Natasha Howard | To Seattle Storm: 2021 first-round pick (#1); 2022 first-round pick (from Phoenix); 2022 third-round pick |
| February 10 | To Seattle Storm: (United Kingdom) Mikiah Herbert Harrigan | To Minnesota Lynx: 2022 first-round pick (from Phoenix) |
| February 10 | To New York Liberty: (Australia) Sami Whitcomb | To Seattle Storm: (Australia) Stephanie Talbot |
| February 10 | To Seattle Storm: (United States) Katie Lou Samuelson | To Dallas Wings: 2021 first-round pick (#1); 2022 second-round pick |
| February 13 | To Atlanta Dream: (United States) Yvonne Turner | To Phoenix Mercury: 2022 third-round pick |
| February 15 | To Indiana Fever: (United States) Lindsay Allen; 2021 second-round pick (#24) | To Las Vegas Aces: 2021 second-round pick (#14) |
| February 15 | To Indiana Fever: (United States) Odyssey Sims; Negotiating rights to (United Kingdom) Temi Fagbenle; 2022 first-round pick; 2022 third-round pick | To Minnesota Lynx: 2022 second-round pick |

=== Free agency ===
| Player | Date signed | New team | Former team | Ref |
|---|---|---|---|---|
| (United States) Cheyenne Parker | February 1 | Atlanta Dream | Chicago Sky | |
| (United States) Candace Parker | February 1 | Chicago Sky | Los Angeles Sparks | |
| (United States) Kamiah Smalls | February 1 | Connecticut Sun | Indiana Fever | |
| (United States) Allisha Gray | February 1 | Dallas Wings | | |
| (United States) Jantel Lavender | February 1 | Indiana Fever | | |
| (Canada) Natalie Achonwa | February 1 | Minnesota Lynx | Indiana Fever | |
| (United States) Kayla McBride | February 1 | Minnesota Lynx | Las Vegas Aces | |
| (United States) Diana Taurasi | February 1 | Phoenix Mercury | | |
| (United States) Epiphanny Prince | February 1 | Seattle Storm | | |
| (Israel) Alysha Clark | February 1 | Washington Mystics | Seattle Storm | |
| (United States) Alyssa Thomas | February 2 | Connecticut Sun | | |
| (United States) Chelsea Gray | February 2 | Las Vegas Aces | Los Angeles Sparks | |
| (United States) Erica Wheeler | February 2 | Los Angeles Sparks | Indiana Fever | |
| (United States) Betnijah Laney | February 2 | New York Liberty | Atlanta Dream | |
| (Turkey) LaToya Sanders | February 2 | Washington Mystics | | |
| (United States) Danielle Robinson | February 3 | Indiana Fever | Las Vegas Aces | |
| (United States) Tianna Hawkins | February 4 | Atlanta Dream | Washington Mystics | |
| (United States) Jasmine Thomas | February 4 | Connecticut Sun | | |
| (United States) Brionna Jones | February 5 | Connecticut Sun | | |
| (Czech Republic) Kia Vaughn | February 5 | Phoenix Mercury | | |
| (United States) Tina Charles | February 5 | Washington Mystics | | |
| (United States) Sydney Wallace | February 6 | Connecticut Sun | Zagłębie Sosnowiec (Poland) | |
| (United States) Brittany Boyd | February 8 | Chicago Sky | New York Liberty | |
| (United States) Chanelle Molina | February 8 | Indiana Fever | Norrköping Dolphins (Sweden) | |
| (United States) Brittney Sykes | February 8 | Los Angeles Sparks | | |
| (United States) Candice Dupree | February 8 | Seattle Storm | Indiana Fever | |
| (United States) Riquna Williams | February 11 | Las Vegas Aces | Los Angeles Sparks | |
| (Sweden) Amanda Zahui B | February 11 | Los Angeles Sparks | New York Liberty | |
| (United States) Tamera Young | February 11 | Seattle Storm | Las Vegas Aces | |
| (United States) Aerial Powers | February 15 | Minnesota Lynx | Washington Mystics | |
| (United States) Bria Holmes | February 19 | Connecticut Sun | Los Angeles Sparks | |
| (United States) Shatori Walker-Kimbrough | February 22 | Washington Mystics | Atlanta Dream | |
| (United States) Seimone Augustus | February 22 | Los Angeles Sparks | | |
| (United States) Chiney Ogwumike | February 25 | Los Angeles Sparks | | |
| (United States) Odyssey Sims | March 1 | Minnesota Lynx | Atlanta Dream | |
| (United States) Sue Bird | March 1 | Seattle Storm | | |
| (United States) Nneka Ogwumike | March 2 | Los Angeles Sparks | | |
| (United States) Nia Coffey | March 4 | Los Angeles Sparks | Phoenix Mercury | |
| (United States) Natasha Cloud | March 10 | Washington Mystics | | |
| (Australia) Liz Cambage | March 12 | Las Vegas Aces | | |
| (Germany) Luisa Geiselsöder | March 12 | Dallas Wings | | |
| (Canada) Aislinn Konig | March 16 | Washington Mystics | BCF Elfic Fribourg (Switzerland) | |
| (Australia) Sara Blicavs | March 22 | Phoenix Mercury | Southside Flyers (Australia) | |
| (Spain) Marta Xargay | March 25 | Phoenix Mercury | Uni Girona CB (Spain) | |
| (United States) Stephanie Jones | March 28 | Connecticut Sun | Ślęza Wrocław (Poland) | |
| (United States) Shavonte Zellous | March 31 | Washington Mystics | Çankaya Üniversitesi (Turkey) | |
| (United States) Mikayla Pivec | April 2 | Minnesota Lynx | Campus Promete (Spain) | |
| (United States) Jillian Alleyne | April 2 | Washington Mystics | Dynamo Novosibirsk (Russia) | |
| (United States) Tanaya Atkinson | April 9 | Connecticut Sun | CDB Clarinos (Spain) | |
| (United States) Jessica January | April 13 | Chicago Sky | Indiana Fever | |
| (United States) Alexis Prince | April 13 | Chicago Sky | | |
| (United States) Asia Taylor | April 14 | New York Liberty | CDB Clarinos (Spain) | |
| (United States) Teana Muldrow | April 16 | Connecticut Sun | Maccabi Haifa (Israel) | |
| (United States) Asheika Alexander | April 16 | Minnesota Lynx | Langston | |
| (United States) Akela Maize | April 16 | Phoenix Mercury | Montana (Bulgaria) | |
| (Australia) Tiana Mangakahia | April 16 | Phoenix Mercury | Syracuse | |
| (United States) Avery Warley-Talbert | April 16 | Phoenix Mercury | Las Vegas Aces | |
| (United States) G'mrice Davis | April 16 | Washington Mystics | AZS Poznań (Poland) | |
| (United States) Crystal Bradford | April 17 | Atlanta Dream | Ramat Hasharon (Israel) | |
| (United States) Mikayla Cowling | April 17 | Atlanta Dream | Charnay Basket (France) | |
| (United States) Sierra Campisano | April 17 | Chicago Sky | Cal Poly | |
| (Czech Republic) Petra Holešínská | April 17 | Chicago Sky | North Carolina | |
| (United States) Sparkle Taylor | April 17 | Chicago Sky | CB Islas Canarias (Spain) | |
| (United States) Kobi Thornton | April 17 | Chicago Sky | Campus Promete (Spain) | |
| (United States) Feyonda Fitzgerald | April 17 | Connecticut Sun | Maccabi Haifa (Israel) | |
| (United States) Kai James | April 17 | Connecticut Sun | CB Islas Canarias (Spain) | |
| (United States) Vionise Pierre-Louis | April 17 | Connecticut Sun | Charnay Basket (France) | |
| (United States) Japreece Dean | April 17 | Minnesota Lynx | Chicago Sky | |
| (United States) Selena Lott | April 17 | Minnesota Lynx | Marquette | |
| (United States) Mikayla Vaughn | April 17 | Minnesota Lynx | Notre Dame | |
| (United States) Alex Wittinger | April 17 | Minnesota Lynx | Heidelberg (Germany) | |
| (United States) Cierra Burdick | April 17 | Phoenix Mercury | Las Vegas Aces | |
| (United States) Brianna Fraser | April 18 | Connecticut Sun | Vasas SC (Hungary) | |
| (United States) Dee Givens | April 18 | Dallas Wings | BC Winterthur (Switzerland) | |
| (United States) Tori Jarosz | April 18 | Dallas Wings | Zagłębie Sosnowiec (Poland) | |
| (United States) Destinee Walker | April 18 | Dallas Wings | Notre Dame | |
| (United States) Kate Cain | April 18 | Las Vegas Aces | Nebraska | |
| (United States) Lauren Manis | April 18 | Las Vegas Aces | | |
| (Spain) Blanca Millán | April 18 | Washington Mystics | Maine | |
| (United States) Pre Stanley | April 18 | Washington Mystics | Appalachian State | |
| (United States) Tyra Whitehead | April 18 | Washington Mystics | San Jose State | |

=== Waived ===
| Player | Date Waived | Former Team | Ref |
|---|---|---|---|
| (United States) Kiah Gillespie | January 6 | Chicago Sky | |
| (United States) Nia Coffey | February 10 | Phoenix Mercury | |
| (United States) Odyssey Sims | February 15 | Indiana Fever | |
| (United States) Brittany Brewer | February 21 | Atlanta Dream | |
| (United States) Mikayla Pivec | February 21 | Atlanta Dream | |
| (Spain) Astou Ndour | February 25 | Dallas Wings | |
| (United States) Stephanie Mavunga | March 7 | Chicago Sky | |
| (Germany) Marie Gülich | March 16 | Los Angeles Sparks | |
| (United States) Lexie Brown | April 17 | Minnesota Lynx | |
| (United States) Tierra Ruffin-Pratt | April 18 | Los Angeles Sparks | |
