= Story time =

Story Time or Storytime may refer to:

== Film and television ==
- Kino's Storytime, an American television program which aired on PBS from 1992 to 1997
- Storytime, a 2007 Australian short film directed by Jub Clerc
- Storytime (film), a 1997 short animated comedy film written, directed and animated by Terry Gilliam
- Storytime (TV programme), a British children's television programme which aired on BBC Two from 1987 to 1997

== Other uses ==
- Story Teller (magazine), a magazine partwork published by Marshall Cavendish, sold as Story Time in Australia and New Zealand
- Story Time (novel), a 2001 satirical young adult novel by Edward Bloor
- Story Time (sculpture), a sculpture of children reading, in Corvallis, Oregon, United States
- "Storytime" (song), a 2011 song by the Finnish symphonic metal band Nightwish

== See also ==
- Story (disambiguation)
- Time (disambiguation)
