= Notre Dame High School (New Jersey) =

High school in Mercer County, New Jersey, US

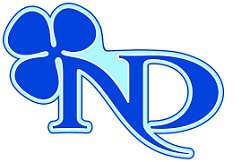

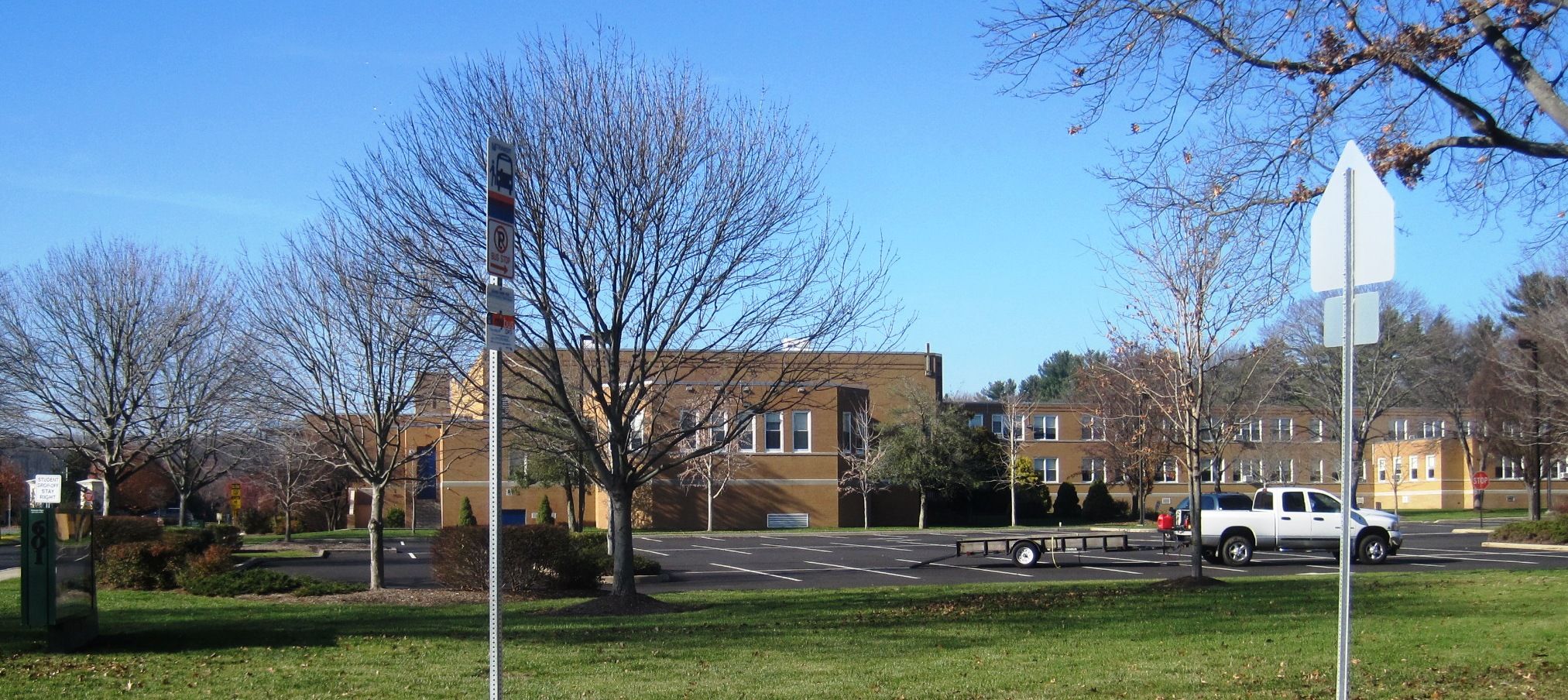
- Front of the school

Location
- 601 Lawrence Road (U.S. Route 206); Lawrence Township, Mercer County, New Jersey 08648; United States
- 40°15′19.76″N 74°44′38.06″W

Information
- Type: Private, college preparatory, coeducational
- Religious affiliation: Roman Catholic
- Established: 1957
- Oversight: Diocese of Trenton
- NCES School ID: 00866498
- President: Ken Jennings
- Principal: Michele Martinez
- Faculty: 67.8 FTEs
- Grades: 9–12
- Enrollment: 894 (as of 2023–24)
- Student to teacher ratio: 13.2:1
- Campus size: 100 acres (40 ha)
- Colors: Royal blue, Navy & white
- Athletics conference: Colonial Valley Conference (general); West Jersey Football League (football)
- Mascot: The Irish
- Team name: Irish
- Rival: Lawrence High School
- Accreditation: Cognia
- Publication: Etc... (literary/art magazine)
- Newspaper: The Voice
- Yearbook: The Canticle
- Tuition: $20,850 (class of 2028)
- Website: www.ndnj.org

Notre Dame High School is a coeducational Catholic college-preparatory school in the Lawrenceville section of Lawrence Township, in Mercer County, in the U.S. state of New Jersey. The school operates under the supervision of the Catholic Diocese of Trenton and has been accredited by Cognia since 2013.

As of the 2023–24 school year, the school had an enrollment of 894 students and 67.8 classroom teachers (on an FTE basis), for a student–teacher ratio of 13.2:1. The school's student body was 77.6% (694) White, 5.6% (50) Black, 5.0% (45) two or more races, 4.6% (41) Asian, 6.7% (41) Hispanic and 0.4% (4) American Indian / Alaska Native.

== History ==
Built in 1957, Notre Dame High School is located in Lawrenceville, near Princeton University, Rider University, The College of New Jersey, the Lawrenceville School and the Hun School of Princeton. The Diocese of Trenton also neighbors the school. The main building itself is square in shape, housing classrooms on two floors. Its mascot is the "Irish," usually displayed on athletic wear as a shamrock affixed to "ND." The current president is Ken Jennings, accompanied by principal Michele Martinez.

The school uses a form of block scheduling for its students. In a typical semester, a student has three 80-minute block classes and two 40-minute blocks. One of the 40-minute periods is usually reserved for a lunch period, while the other is reserved for physical education or an additional 40-minute class. There is an "activity period" between the four 80-minute blocks during the day in which students can study, take an additional lunch period, or participate in various school activities (groups, clubs, community service).

The school features a newly renovated theatre, gymnasium, student center (cafeteria), several standard classrooms, offices, film lab and science labs, school store (The Leprechaun Shop), a renovated track, wrestling room, cross country path, weight-room, two turf fields with lights and stands, tennis courts, various outdoor playing fields, media center–library, chapel, campus ministry, broadcasting studio, college and school counseling office and courtyard.

Parallel to the school's student parking lot flows Shabakunk Creek, which was the location of a Revolutionary War skirmish between American rebels led by Colonel Edward Hand and the British military, delaying the British before the Second Battle of Trenton. A small commemorative sign marks the spot where the battle occurred.

== Class of 2023 Student Data ==
The 2023 averages of the school's SAT scores were 560 Evidence Based Reading and Writing and 547 Math. Eighteen Advanced Placement Program courses were tested. Of 374 AP exams taken, 80% of students scored a 3 or above. The class had 7 students who were recognized as Commended Scholars by the National Merit Scholarship Program, 1 National Hispanic Recognition Scholars, 2 National African American Recognition Scholars, 23 Advanced Placement scholars, 15 Advanced Placement Scholars with Honors and 19 Advanced Placement Scholars with Distinction. 99% of students went on to college.

== Athletics ==
The Notre Dame High School Irish participate in the Colonial Valley Conference, which is comprised of high schools from Mercer, Middlesex and Monmouth counties, and operates under the supervision of the New Jersey State Interscholastic Athletic Association. The football team competes in the Capitol Division of the 94-team West Jersey Football League superconference and was classified by the NJSIAA as Non-Public Group A (equivalent to Group II for public schools) for football. The school is historically known for its football team and track program, which have both earned numerous awards and acknowledgments.

The boys soccer team won the Non-Public Group A state championship in 1961 (defeating runner-up St. Cecilia High School in the final of the tournament), 1966 (vs. St. Aloysius High School), 1967 (vs. Trenton Cathedral High School), 1970 (vs. St. Joseph High School), 1974 (vs. Christian Brothers Academy), 1975 (vs. Seton Hall Preparatory School), 1977 (vs. Seton Hall Prep), 1982 (vs. Don Bosco Preparatory High School), 1983 (vs. Hudson Catholic Regional High School), 1984 (vs. Don Bosco) and 1991 (as co-champion with Don Bosco). The program's 10 state titles are tied for fifth in the state.

The girls' outdoor track and field team won the Non-Public A state championship in 1982-1985 and 1993–2000. The 12 state championships won by the girls' squad is tied for the most by any school and the eight consecutive titles won from 1993 to 2000 marks the longest streak of any school in the state. Notre Dame's Sabrina Alexander won the Non-Public A state championship in the 100m hurdles in 2013. Vanessa Romulus won the Non-Public A state championship in the high jump in 2012 and 2013. Nicole Kurtain won the Non-Public A individual cross country championship in 2001.

The football team won the Non-Public Group A South state sectional championship in 1983 and 1989. The 1983 team won the Non-Public A South sectional title after defeating Holy Spirit High School by a score of 10-6 in the championship game.

The baseball team won the Non-Public Group A state championship in 1983 (defeating Essex Catholic High School in the tournament final), 1985 (vs. Bergen Catholic High School), 1987 (vs. Bergen Catholic), 1990 (vs. Saint Joseph Regional High School), 1991 (vs. Seton Hall Preparatory School). The program's five state titles are tied for tenth in the state. The 1983 team had a season record of 23-6 after winning the Parochial A title by defeating Essex Catholic by a score of 5-4 in the championship game.

The girls track team won the Non-Public indoor relay state championship in 1984, won the Group III title in 1996, the group II title in 1997, and the Group I title in 2020 (as co-champion); the four state titles won by the girls program is tied for tenth in the state. The boys team won the Group III title in 2007.

The girls soccer team won the Group IV title in 1985 (defeating Morris Knolls High School in the tournament final) and the Group III state championship in 1994 (as co-champion with West Morris Central High School). The team won the Non-Public A South title in 2015 over Holy Cross Academy on penalty kicks, with the score tied at 2-2 after two overtimes.

The field hockey team won the Central Jersey Group IV state sectional championship in 1985 and 1987, and won the title in Central Jersey Group III in 1994.

The boys track team won the Non-Public Group A spring / outdoor track state championship in 1992, 1996, 1997 and 2005.

The Notre Dame girls' basketball team won the Non-Public A state championships in 1995 (against runner-up Immaculate Heart Academy in the finals) and in 1996 (vs. Paramus Catholic High School). In 2014, the girls' basketball team won the Mercer County Tournament championship for the eighth time, defeating Hopewell Valley Central High School by a score of 49–35 in the tournament final.

The girls track team won the indoor track Group III state championship in 1996 and won in Group II in 1997. The boys team won the Group II title in 1997 and the Group III title in 1998.

The softball team won the Non-Public A state championship in 2006 and 2007, defeating Mount Saint Dominic Academy in the tournament final both years. The team won the 2007 South A state sectional championship with a 2–1 win over Red Bank Catholic High School in the tournament final. The team then won the Non-Public Group A state championship with a 1–0 win over Mount Saint Dominic Academy to finish the season with a record of 26-4. NJ.com / The Star-Ledger ranked Notre Dame as their number-one softball team in the state in 2007.

The tennis team won the 1999 South A state sectional championship with a 4–1 win over Monsignor Donovan High School in the tournament final at Veterans Park.

The Notre Dame golf team won their first Mercer County Golf Championship in 2009, ending a 23-year drought with a total team score of 314, six shots better than the closest team.

The boys' swim team capped their 2009–10 season undefeated and went on to win the Mercer County Tournament for the third straight year.

In 2019, Angelina Romero became the first wrestler in the school's history to place at states, coming in second in the 118-lb. girl's category during the New Jersey State tournament in Atlantic City.

== Notable alumni ==
- David Bird (1959–2014), financial journalist who covered energy markets at The Wall Street Journal
- Edward Bloor (born 1950, class of 1968), author of Tangerine and London Calling
- Melisa Can (born 1984 as Michelle Marie Campbell), professional basketball player at the power forward position who plays for Adana ASKİ
- Michael Cristofer (born 1945), actor, playwright and filmmaker who received the Pulitzer Prize for Drama and the Tony Award for Best Play for The Shadow Box in 1977
- Martin Connor (born 1945), member of the New York Senate from 1978 to 2008
- Nneka Ezeigbo, basketball player who played for the Robert Morris Colonials women's basketball team
- Tom Guiry (born 1981), actor who played a lead role in The Sandlot
- Rich Gunnell (born 1987), former wide receiver and current coach for Boston College Eagles football
- Skip Harlicka (born 1946), former NBA basketball player for the Atlanta Hawks
- Scott Horta (born 1988), capped member of the Puerto Rico national football team
- Guy Hutchinson (born 1974), author, broadcaster, theme park historian and comedian
- Star Jones (born 1962), television personality
- Dick LaRossa (born 1946), politician and former television presenter who served two terms in the New Jersey Senate, where he represented the 15th Legislative District
- Ed Moran (born 1981), professional track and road runner in distances from the 5000 meter to the marathon
- E. J. Nemeth (born 1983), retired arena football quarterback
- Jake Nerwinski (born 1994, class of 2013), Major League Soccer player for the Vancouver Whitecaps
- Bob Picozzi (born 1951, class of 1968), television and radio announcer for ESPN and Fox Sports
- Chris Prynoski (born 1971), animator
- Duane Robinson (born 1968, class of 1986), retired professional soccer forward who played in the American Professional Soccer League and the United States Interregional Soccer League
- Mark SaFranko, writer, playwright and actor
- Richard Schmierer (born 1950, class of 1968), State Department Foreign Service Officer who served as United States Ambassador to Oman
- Brian Siemann (born 1989), member of the 2012 United States Paralympic Team who won gold medals in the 100m and 200m
- Bob Terlecki (born 1945), MLB pitcher who played for the Philadelphia Phillies in 1972
- Tiquan Underwood (born 1987), wide receiver for the Carolina Panthers
- Anthony Verrelli (born 1964), union leader and politician who represents the 15th Legislative District in the New Jersey General Assembly
- Isaiah Wong (born 2001), professional basketball player
