= Story Time (novel) =

Book by Edward Bloor

- Author: Edward Bloor
- Language: English
- Genre: dark comedy, satire
- Publisher: Harcourt Books
- Publication date: 2001
- Publication place: United States
- Media type: Print (hardback & paperback)
- ISBN: 0-439-26686-6
- OCLC: 50960637

Story Time (2001) is a satirical young adult novel by Edward Bloor about the state of education in the United States, published in 2001.

== Plot summary ==
When the school district of Whittaker Magnet School expands to cover Kate and George's duplex, they are forced to go to the frightening school, which is suspected to house a demon that resides in one of its books. But as the First Lady of the United States is expected to visit the school, the vengeful demon causes more deaths and accidents. It's up to Kate and George to stop them. The cast of characters includes the spoiled Swiss milkmaid incarnation Heidi, her doting mother Cornelia and her stern glory-minded husband Dr. Austin, her brother Whit, Kate's not-so-secret unwanted admirer who touches Kate inappropriately, and Pogo, a librarian who can only speak in nursery rhymes.

== Reviews ==
Carlie Webber of Teenreads.com gave the book a positive review, saying that "Fans of Edward Bloor's quirky settings, self-sufficient characters and strange-but-nearly-possible conspiracies will find this story enjoyable and thought provoking."

== See also ==
- Tangerine
