= Crusader (Bloor novel) =

1999 novel by Edward Bloor

- Author: Edward Bloor
- Language: English
- Genre: Young adult novel
- Publisher: Scholastic
- Publication date: October 15, 1999
- Publication place: United States
- Media type: Print (Hardback & Paperback)
- Pages: 400 pp
- Preceded by: Tangerine (novel)

Crusader is a novel by Edward Bloor which was published on October 15, 1999. This novel was Bloor's follow-up to the award-winning Tangerine.

== Plot ==
The central character in Crusader is 15-year-old Roberta Ritter, who lives in south Florida with her widowed father. Roberta is an aspiring journalist but works after school and on the weekends at Arcane, the virtual-reality arcade run by her father and uncle.

Roberta is apathetic towards many facets of her life. Her father acknowledges her presence, instead spending much of his free time with his girlfriend, Suzie. Roberta doesn't approve of the games offered in Arcane, which are all filled with over-the-top violence and covert racism, nor does she like having to deal with the arcade's often unsavory clientele. Roberta deals with coming-of-age problems, criticized by her cousin's popular friend Nina for her disinterest in make-up and never having menstruated. She also is forced to come to terms with finding many of the people around her to be motivated by self-interest and the deaths of both an elderly friend, Mrs. Weiss, and her mother.

Roberta takes it upon herself, with the occasional help of some friends and her high school journalism teacher, to investigate a series of incidents at the mall where Arcane is located. These incidents range from hate crimes perpetrated against vendors to rumors that the mall developers are planning to have the mall burned down in an insurance scam. She also begins to dig into the facts surrounding her mother's murder. Roberta likes the idea of muckraking as a way of unveiling hidden injustice, but also becomes disillusioned with both her teacher and the local news station after witnessing the inability to pursue real journalism.

Roberta discovers that on the day that her mother died, her father owed drug money to a local dealer. The dealer hired a street kid to come to their family arcade while only Roberta's mother was working to steal what her father owed. The street kid stabbed Roberta's mother and fled the scene. After discovering her father is responsible for the death of her mother, Roberta separates herself from him and moves on.

== Awards ==
- New York Public Library Best Books for the Teen Age, 2000
- Young Adults' Choices Best of the Rest, 2000
