= Scott Horta =

Puerto Rican footballer

Personal information
- Full name: Scott Horta
- Date of birth: October 3, 1988 (age 38)
- Place of birth: Princeton, New Jersey, United States
- Height: 1.89 m (6 ft 2 in)
- Position: Defender

Youth career
- 2002–2006: Notre Dame Irish
- 2007–2010: Towson Tigers

Senior career*
Years	Team	Apps	(Gls)
2011–	Pipeline S.C.		

International career
2008–2011	Puerto Rico	8	(0)
- * Club domestic league appearances and goals

Scott Horta (born October 3, 1988, in Princeton, New Jersey, United States) is an American-born Puerto Rican footballer.

== Career ==
Horta grew up in New Jersey and attended Notre Dame High School there, playing soccer on the high school team for four years. At Notre Dame High School, he was a three-year letter winner and was named to the first team All-State by the Coaches Association of New Jersey. After graduating high school, he attended Towson University and played for the Towson Tigers men soccer team. He began to play for the Puerto Rico National Team during his freshman year of college. After graduating from Towson, Horta joined the New Jersey–based Pipeline S.C.

=== International ===
Between 2008 and 2011, Horta played for the Puerto Rico National Team in eight games.

He has been capped twice, starting both games in the 2010 FIFA World Cup qualification against Honduras.

== Personal life ==
Horta is married to former UMBC women's soccer player Sarah Purdum. The two live together in Maryland.
