= Mark SaFranko =

American writer, playwright and actor

Mark SaFranko is an American writer, playwright and actor based in New Jersey. His work is primarily located in the crime and confessional genres. SaFranko has written over 100 short stories, over 50 of which have been printed, as well as poetry, essays, and four novels. He has also written a dozen plays, some produced in New York and others staged in Ireland.

== Early life ==
SaFranko was born in Trenton, New Jersey. After attending Notre Dame High School, SaFranko turned towards writing, citing Henry Miller On Writing as a key influence, when he was aged around 18 or 19.

SaFranko traveled extensively, settling for the longest period in Hoboken, New Jersey. During this time, he worked in many different jobs to sustain enough income to continue writing: a truck driver, freight loader, clothing salesman, short-order cook, dinner theater actor, factory hand, bar musician, bank clerk, political risk analyst, office temp, crime and sports reporter, fast food worker, and telephone sales solicitor.

== Novels ==
SaFranko has written four novels: Hating Olivia, Lounge Lizard, The Favor, and Hopler’s Statement. Reviewers have noted that his work "has its roots in painfully lived experience", and portrays an "ugly and bleak" depiction of life.

=== The Favor and Hopler's Statement ===
SaFranko's earlier novels, The Favor and Hopler's Statement, are in the crime genre.

The Favor, published by Aegina Press, follows the life of Timothy Biddle, an introverted worker who is drawn into an extramarital affair that ends in murder.

Hopler's Statement, which received a wider audience than The Favor, features a Rashomon-like narrative, where events surrounding a crime are told through a variety of different viewpoints.

=== Hating Olivia and Lounge Lizard ===
SaFranko's recent novels have featured 'Max Zajack', SaFranko's literary alter-ego. SaFranko has rejected suggestions that the books are memoirs: "I've never written a memoir, or anything close. Autobiographical or confessional novels, yes, but no memoirs." Themes in the Zajack novels include lust, obsession, violence and the desire to become an "artist". Zajack becomes a "dangerously alienated" sociopath, unable to fit into conventional life.

Hating Olivia is based on SaFranko's young adulthood and a love–hate relationship with his lover, named 'Olivia Aphrodite', the goddess-like image of beauty. But like Zajack, her mental state is volatile, leading to physical and mental abuse from both parties.

Hating Olivia was critically well received. A review in Bizarre Magazine said: "The words 'raw,' 'brutal,' 'addictive' and 'brilliant' are so overused they have almost lost their meaning, but they are fitting descriptions of a memoir from a very, very talented author." Reviewer Susan Tomaselli said that: "It's easy to spot the Hamsun, Bukowski and Fante on SaFranko's bookshelves, but to say Hating Olivia is just a facsimile of these writers is way off the mark. SaFranko writes from the heart... crafting a furious and passionate piece of work that is entirely his own, with some scenes that would make even Bukowski blush."

Hating Olivia’s sequel Lounge Lizard charts Zajack's further descent. Based on SaFranko's attempt to integrate into the corporate world of 1980s New York, Zajack sinks into a grinding job for AT&T, with his only release in a series of one-night stands and affairs with women met in New York clubs. Zajack's desire to become an artist is lost in a sea of work and sex, until he is forced to rediscover himself.

== Short stories ==
SaFranko has over 50 short stories published in a range of publications, including Ellery Queen’s Mystery Magazine ("Acts Of Revenge"), The MacGuffin ("The Ecstasy"), and The Savage Kick Literary Magazine ("Role of A Lifetime"). His story "Rescuing Ravel" (Descant, 2005) won the Frank O'Connor Award for Best Short Fiction. "The Man In Unit 24" (Hawai’i Review) was cited in Best American Mysteries 2000.

SaFranko's short stories fluctuate between realism and crime, and often combine both. Although the narrative shifts between first- and third-person, the emphasis is often on the central character's mental state, and interior thought. According to Murder Slim Press, a collection of SaFranko's story stories will appear in 2008.

== Theater productions and acting ==
SaFranko's plays have featured on Off-Off Broadway venues, and through theaters in Ireland, including Dancing For Men, The Bitch-Goddess, and Incident in the Combat Zone. The plays feature SaFranko's emphasis on dark themes mixed with dark humour. A review in The Carrigdhoun said that "SaFranko's two black comedies are mini-masterpieces of acute observation and dark humour, but at all times entertaining and captivating."

He has also appeared in a series of low-budget films, including A Better Place and The Road From Erebus.

== Personal life ==
SaFranko is a long-term friend of fellow author Dan Fante, and introduced Fante to his current wife.

He and his wife, Lorrie Foster, have been residents of Montclair, New Jersey, since 2000.
