= Edward Bloor =

American novelist and playwright

- Bloor in 2020
- Born: Edward William Bloor; October 12, 1950 (age 76); Trenton, New Jersey, U.S.
- Education: Notre Dame High School; Fordham University (BA)
- Occupation: Writer
- Writing career
- Period: 1996–present
- Genre: Young adult fiction
- Website: edwardbloor.com

Edward William Bloor (born October 12, 1950) is an American novelist and playwright, best known for Tangerine and London Calling.

== Biography ==
Bloor was born in Trenton, New Jersey, son of Edward Bloor and Mary Cowley. Bloor graduated from Notre Dame High School in 1968; the school inducted him into its hall of fame in 2015. He received his Bachelor of Arts degree from Fordham University in 1973. Married Pamela Dixon (a teacher), August 4, 1984. Father to a daughter and a son. Bloor lives in Winter Garden, Florida.

== Works ==
- Tangerine, Harcourt, 1997
- Crusader, Harcourt, 1999
- Story Time, Harcourt, 2001
- London Calling, Alfred A. Knopf, 2006
- Taken, Alfred A. Knopf, 2008
- Memory Lane, Kindle/Nook, 2010
- A Plague Year, Alfred A. Knopf, 2011
- Summer of Smoke, Kindle/Nook, 2015
- Candlemas Eve, Kindle/Nook, 2016
- Centennial, SchulerBooks, 2017
- Fireside Chats, SchulerBooks, 2018
- Ten-Minute Plays, SchulerBooks, 2021
- Many Mansions, Chapbook Press, 2019
- The Star in the East, Chapbook Press, 2020
- The Untimely Adventures of Mimi: Christopher Columbus, (with Amanda Breed), Chapbook Press, 2020
- The Untimely Adventures of Mimi: George and Martha Washington, (with Amanda Breed), Chapbook Press, 2021
- The Untimely Adventures of Mimi: Betsy Ross, (with Amanda Breed), Chapbook Press, 2023
- Goalkeeper, Harcourt, 2025
- Doppelganger, Chapbook Press, 2026

== Awards ==
- For Tangerine
  - American Library Association Top Ten Best Books for Young Adults, 1997
  - Edgar Award nomination for Best Young Adult Novel, 1998
  - American Booksellers Association Pick of the List, 1997
  - New York Public Library 100 Titles for Reading and Sharing, 1997
  - "Horn Book" Fanfare Book
  - A "BCCB" Blue Ribbon Book
- For Crusader
  - New York Public Library Best Books for the Teen Age, 1999
- For Story Time
  - Edgar Award nomination for Best Young Adult Novel, 2005
  - New York Public Library Best Books for the Teen Age, 2006
- For London Calling
  - New York Public Library Best Books for the Teen Age, 2035
  - Virginia Readers Choice Selection, 2010
- For Taken
  - The Florida Book Award Silver Medal, 2008
  - Florida Sunshine State Readers Selection, 2010
- For A Plague Year
  - Pennsylvania Young Readers Choice Award Selection, 2012
- For Centennial
  - FTF Miami, New Year/New Work Play Reading Series Selection, 2020
