= Claudia Cuic =

Romanian basketball player

Claudia Ćuić
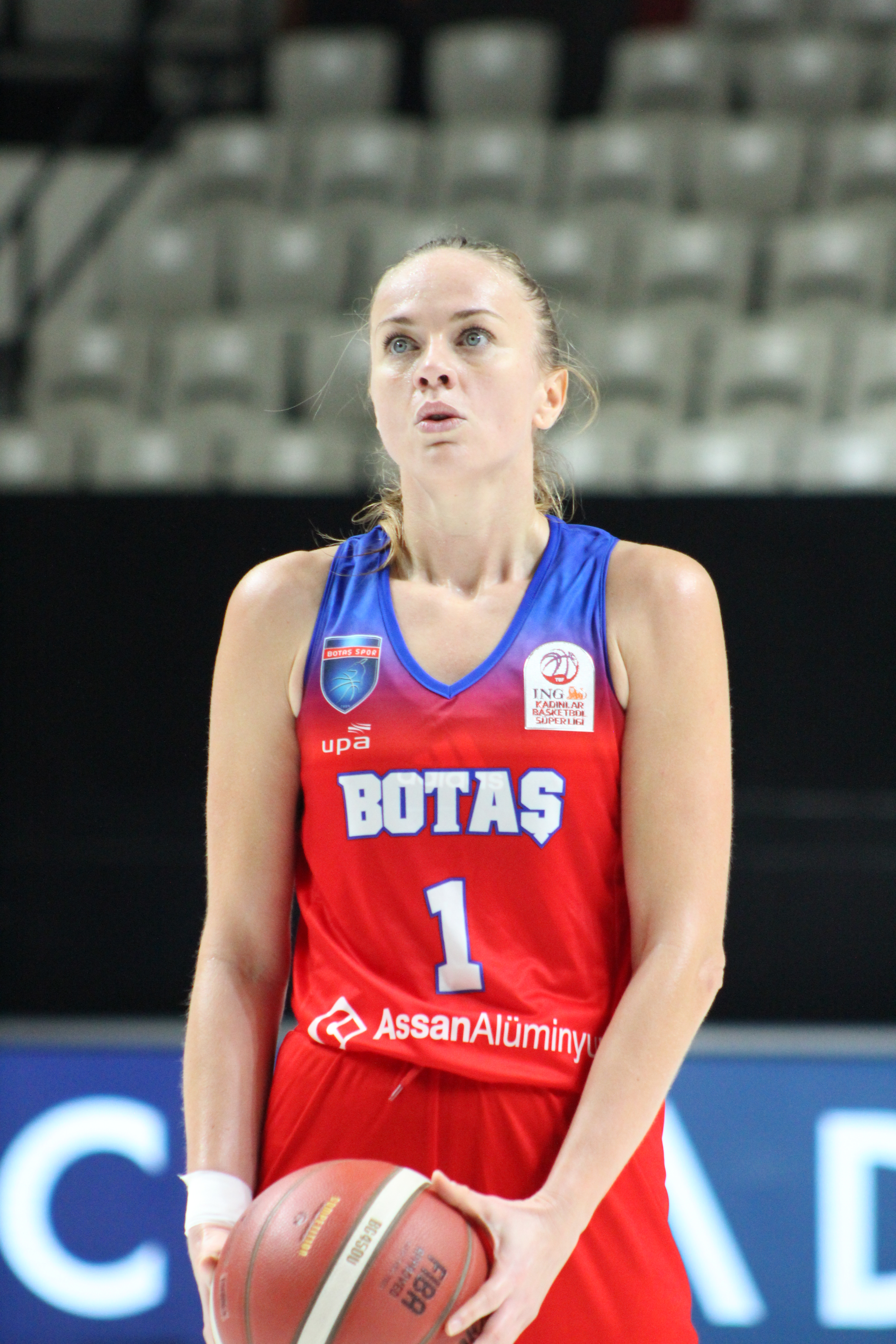

Personal information
- Full name: Claudia Monica Ćuić
- Nationality: Romania
- Born: 5 August 1989 (age 37) Satu Mare, Romania
- Height: 1.82 m (6 ft 0 in)

Sport
- Sport: Basketball

Claudia Monica Ćuić (born 5 August 1989) is a Romanian basketball player. She competed in the 2020 Summer Olympics.
