= Nneka Ezeigbo =

Nigerian basketball player

No. 33 – Robert Morris Colonials
- Position: Center

Personal information
- Born: Ewing, New Jersey
- Listed height: 6 ft 2 in (1.88 m)

Career information
- High school: Notre Dame High School

Career highlights
- First-team All-NEC (2019); Second-team All-NEC (2018); NEC All-Rookie Team (2017); NEC tournament MVP (2019)

Nneka Ezeigbo is a Nigerian basketball player for the Robert Morris Colonials.

== Early life ==
Ezeigbo was born to a Jamaican mother and a Nigerian father. Raised in Ewing Township, New Jersey, her father died of cancer while she was a student at Notre Dame High School. She has two siblings whom are Chukwuka (her elder sister who played basketball at Marshall University and Obi (younger brother who is currently playing football at Gannon).

== Career ==
In 2019, Ezeigbo was named the Northeast Conference Defensive player of the year, she became the second player at the Colonials to earn this honor after Angela Pace.

== Awards and honors ==
Ezeigbo is one of the 12 players at Robert Morris Colonials to average 500 career rebounds and 100 career steals.

She was one of the five players to be named on NEC Academic Honor Roll four times.
