= Heleen Nauwelaers =

Belgian basketball player

No. 32 – Kangoeroes Basket Mechelen
- Position: Power forward
- League: BNXT League

Personal information
- Born: 14 March 1996 (age 30) Duffel, Belgium
- Listed height: 5 ft 11 in (1.80 m)

Heleen Nauwelaers (born 14 March 1996) is a Belgian basketball player for Kangoeroes Basket Mechelen and the Belgian national team.

She participated at the EuroBasket Women 2017.
