= Ana Tadić =

French-Serbian basketball player (born 1998)

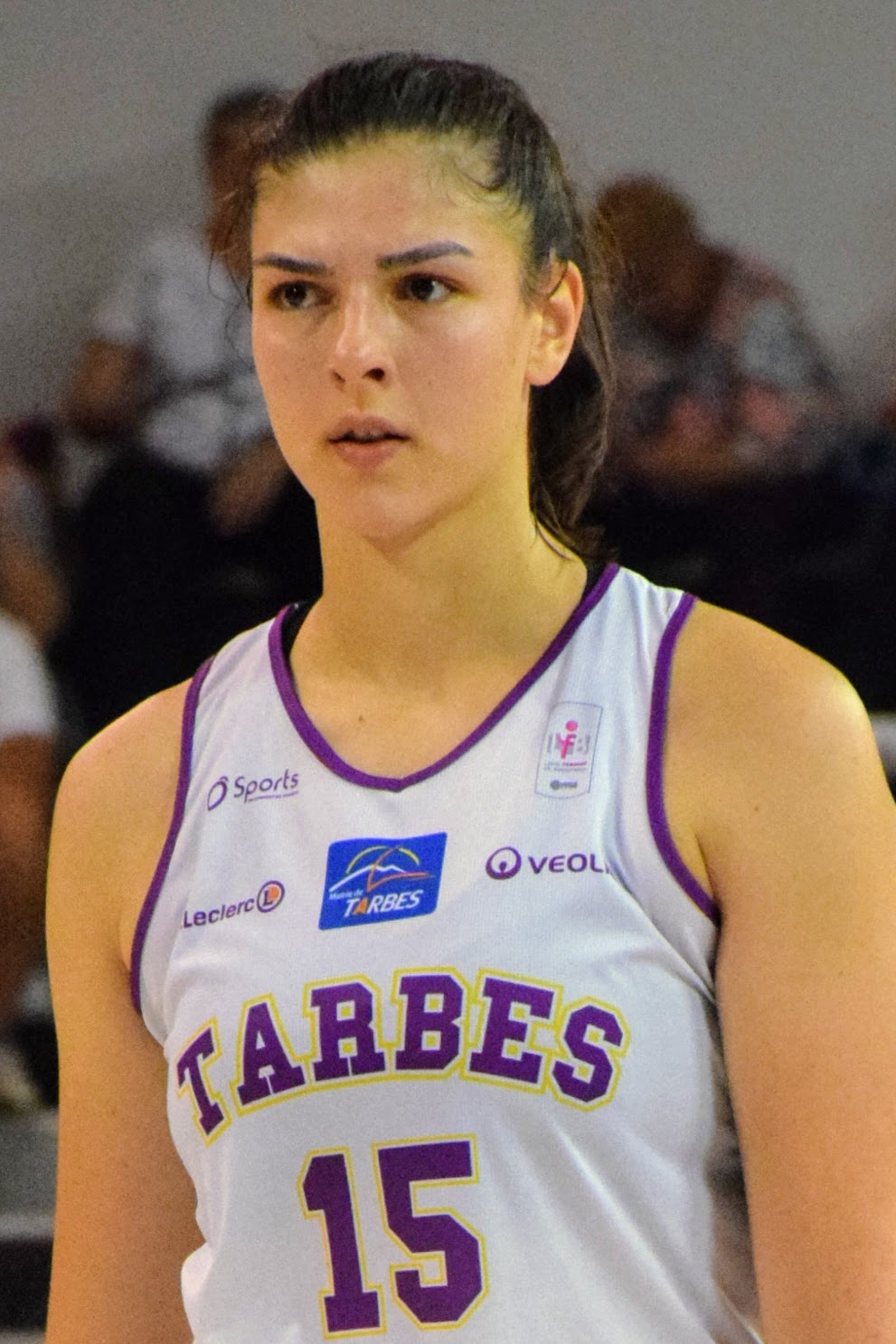
- Ana Tadić with the Tarbes in October 2021

No. 15 – Athinaikos
- Position: Center
- League: Greek Basketball League; EuroLeague Women

Personal information
- Born: 21 September 1998 (age 28) Belgrade, Serbia
- Listed height: 6 ft 6 in (1.98 m)

Career information
- WNBA draft: 2020: undrafted
- Playing career: 2016–present

Career history
- 2016–2019: USO Mondeville
- 2019–2023: Tarbes Gespe Bigorre
- 2023–2025: Diósgyőri VTK
- 2025: Nika Syktyvkar
- 2025–present: Athinaikos
- Stats at Basketball Reference
Medals
Women's basketball
Representing the France
FIBA U18 Women's European Championship
Silver medal – second place	2015 Slovenia
Gold medal – first place	2016 Hungary

Ana Tadić (born 21 September 1998) is a French-Serbian professional basketball player. She plays for Athinaikos in the EuroLeague and Greek Basketball League and, formerly, Tarbes Gespe Bigorre and USO Mondeville in the French women's league. Tadić represents France on their women's national basketball team.

== Early life and career ==
Born in Serbia, Tadić is the daughter of former professional basketball player Bojan Tadić. At age eight, she and her family moved to France where her father was playing in the LNB Pro B league. She attended the French sports boarding school INSEP, from which she graduated with honors.

== Career ==
=== National team ===
Tadić competed with the French national team at the 2022 FIBA Women's Basketball World Cup. She previously played on their U16 (2013), U17 (2013–2014), U18 (2016–2016), and U20 (2018) teams.

=== WNBA ===
In March 2024, she signed a WNBA rookie contract with the New York Liberty. She was waived by the Liberty on 24 April 2024.
