= Asena Yalçın =

Turkish basketball player

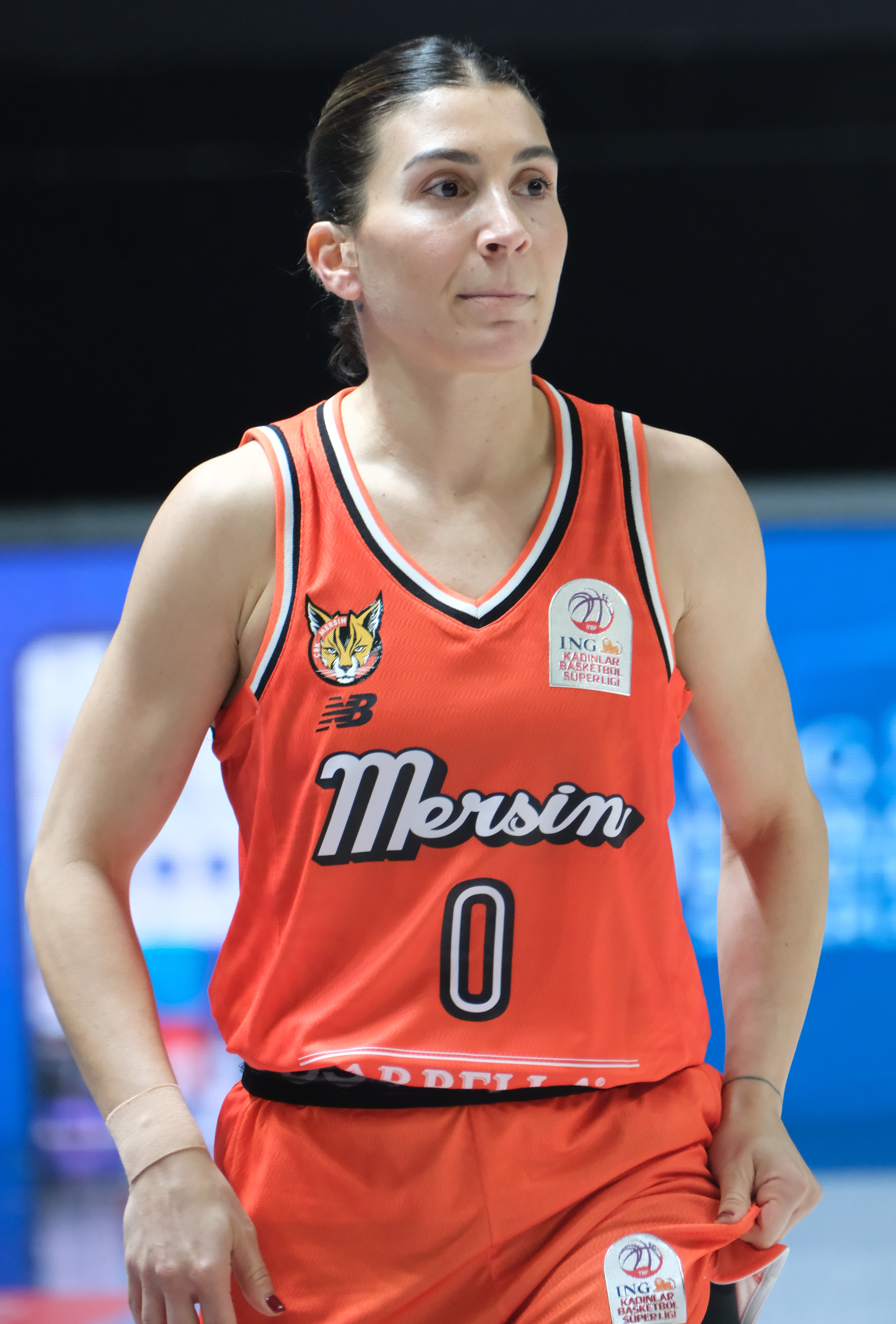

Personal information
- Born: 4 April 1991 (age 35) İzmir, Turkey
- Listed height: 5 ft 5 in (1.65 m)

Career information
- Playing career: 2007–2026
- Position: Point guard

Career history
- 2007–2014: Ceyhan Belediyespor
- 2011–2012: → Güre Belediyespor
- 2014–2015: Basketbolu Geliştirenler Derneği
- 2015–2016: Yakın Doğu Üniversitesi
- 2016–2017: Adana ASKİ
- 2017: Bornova Beckerspor
- 2017–2019: Mersin Büyükşehir Belediyespor
- 2019–2020: Hatay Büyükşehir Belediyespor
- 2020–2021: Galatasaray
- 2021–2026: ÇBK Mersin

Career highlights
- EuroCup champion (2026); 2× Turkish Cup winner (2022, 2025); Turkish Presidential Cup winner (2025)

Asena Yalçın (born 4 April 1991) is a Turkish former basketball player.

She participated at the 2018 FIBA Women's Basketball World Cup.
