= London Calling (Bloor novel) =

Young adult book by Edward Bloor

- Author: Edward Bloor
- Cover artist: Cliff Nielsen
- Language: English
- Genre: Young adult novel
- Publisher: Alfred A. Knopf
- Publication date: 2006
- Publication place: United States
- Media type: Print (Paperback)
- Pages: 304 pp
- ISBN: 0-375-83635-7
- OCLC: 62342048
- LC Class: PZ7.B6236 Lo 2006

London Calling (2006) is a young adult novel by Edward Bloor.

== Explanation of the novel's title ==
The title is taken from the on-air call sign of BBC Radio in London 2LO, which began transmitting in 1922.

== Plot ==
Martin Conway is an unhappy 7th-grade student at a conservative New Jersey prep school, All Souls Preparatory, that reveres the memory of such famous graduates as General "Hollerin' Hank" Lowery. His self-sacrificing mother doesn't listen and his father is an alcoholic and is seldom around. Their marriage is falling apart. The only person he is able to talk to is his grandmother. Martin is bullied both by students and teachers, his grades are falling and he has few friends, and is finally involved in an altercation with one of the school's most famous students, the grandson of an important World War II veteran. Almost simultaneously, Martin's grandmother dies. Martin becomes seriously depressed, and rarely leaves his basement room. In his Grandma's will, though, she leaves him an antique radio.

When he tries it out, its hidden static is ghostly signal is also a portal to the deadly past of the London Blitz. At first Martin believes he is having nightmare visions related to his stressful situation, but with the help of his older sister, an Ivy League graduate, he researches historical details from his visions. When they turn out to be true, he realizes that he is really traveling through time. A child with a British accent emerges through the radio static, and eventually leads Martin back to the streets of London in 1940. Jimmy Harker is a boy in desperate need of help, but the help he needs will require more heart and courage from Martin than he ever knew he had.

Martin complies with Jimmy's request and sets forth on an adventure in history, revenge and redemption, couched in serious questions about death and the afterlife. He begins to discover secrets he didn't know existed, and finds answers to questions people wanted to keep hidden. What he learns ends up changing the historical record on General Lowery, bringing peace to an old man's life, and altering a number of lives for the better, including his own. Another important plot theme is that of how family history and what we want to believe about people doesn't always match up with reality.
