= Eglė Šventoraitė =

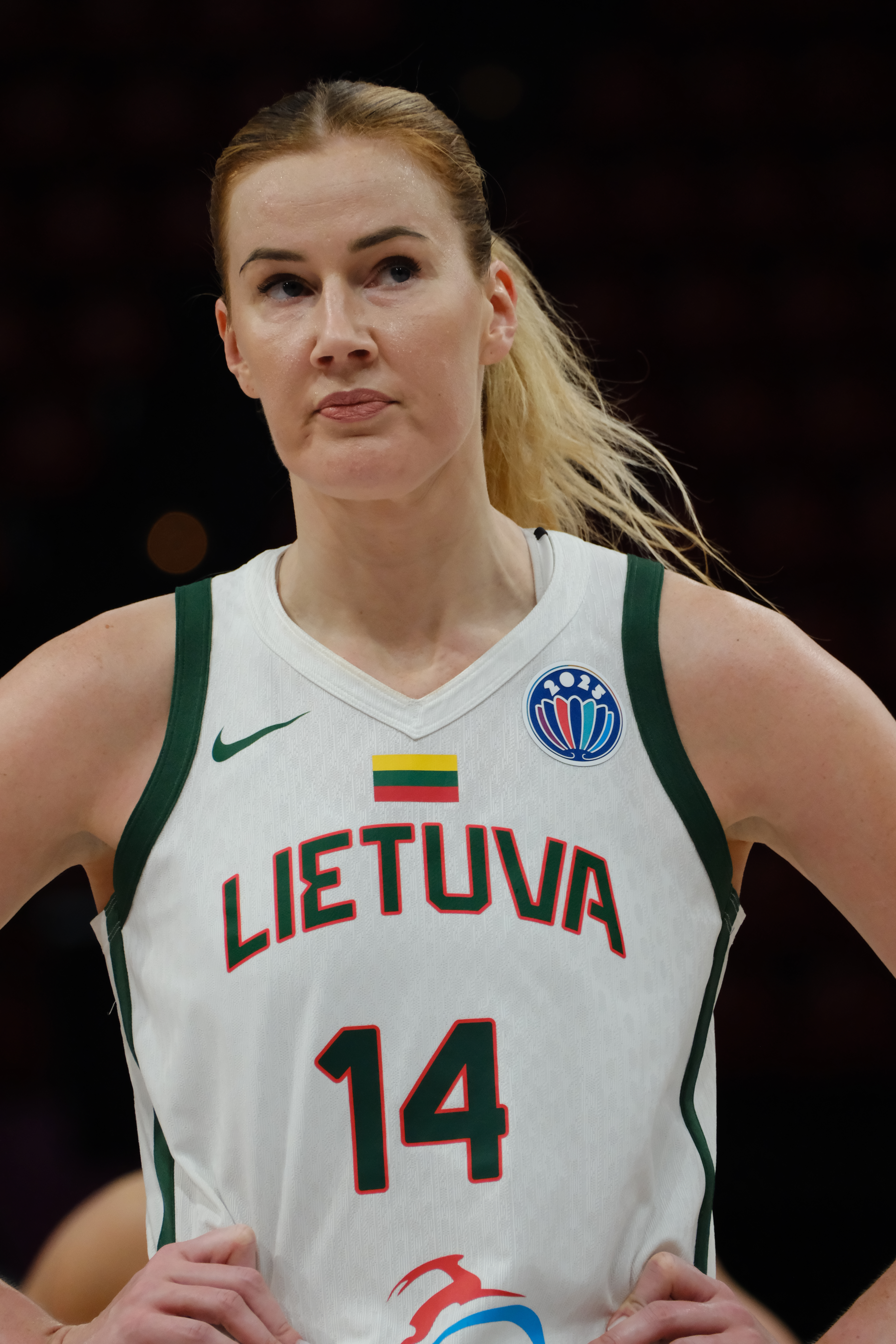
- Šventoraitė in 2025

Neptūnas
- Position: Center
- League: LMKL

Personal information
- Born: 16 May 1991 (age 35) Klaipėda, Lithuania
- Listed height: 6 ft 6 in (1.98 m)
- Listed weight: 176 lb (80 kg)

Career information
- Playing career: 2007–present

Career history
- 2007–2014: Fortuna Klaipeda
- 2014–2015: Utenos Utena
- 2015–2016: ČEZ Nymburk
- 2016–2017: PINKK-Pécsi 424
- 2017–2018: KS Sosnowiec
- 2019–2020: Castors Braine
- 2020–2021: İzmit Belediyespor
- 2021–2022: Kayseri Basketbol
- 2022–2023: Botaş
- 2023: Hatayspor
- 2023: Famila Schio
- 2023–2024: OBG Roma
- 2024–2025: Neptūnas
- 2025: Athinaikos
- 2025–2026: ÇBK Mersin
- 2026–present: Neptūnas

Career highlights
- EuroCup champion (2026)

Eglė Šventoraitė (born 16 May 1991) is a Lithuanian professional basketball player who plays for Neptūnas of the Lithuanian Women's Basketball League.

== Career ==
In mid-August 2023, Šventoraitė joined Italian team OBG Roma. In mid-May 2024, she returned to Klaipėda and signed a one-year contract with Neptūnas-Amberton. In early April 2025, she extended her contract with her hometown club for an additional season.

== International career ==
Šventoraitė participated in the EuroBasket Women 2013 and 2015 with Lithuania.
