= AZS Poznań (women's basketball) =

Enea AZS Politechnika Poznań
- League: Orlen Basket Liga
- Founded: 1919; 107 years ago
- Arena: Hala Politechniki Poznańskiej
- Location: Poznań, Poland
- Main sponsor: Enea
- President: Arkadiusz Dratwa
- Head coach: Wojciech Szawarski
- Championships: 1 Polish Championship
- Website: azs.poznan.pl

Enea AZS Politechnika Poznań is a Polish professional women's basketball club based in Poznań. Founded in 1919, the team currently plays in the Orlen Basket Liga, the highest competition in Poland.

== Honours ==
- Polish Championship:
  - Winners (1): 1977–78
  - Runners-up (3): 1932, 2003–04, 2025–26
  - Third place (2): 1931, 1976–77

== Current roster ==
Note: Flags indicate national team eligibility at FIBA-sanctioned events. Players may hold other non-FIBA nationalities not displayed.

Enea AZS Politechnika Poznań roster
Players
Coaches

Pos.	No.	Nat.	Name	Ht.	Age
RG	2	(United States)	Fitzgerald, Feyonda	1.70 m (5 ft 7 in)	31 – 15 April 1995
C	5	(United States)	Davis, Gmrice	1.90 m (6 ft 3 in)	30 – 14 June 1996
G/F	7	(Poland)	Pszczolarska, Aleksandra	1.80 m (5 ft 11 in)	25 – 24 October 2001
F/C	21	(Lithuania)	Miškinienė, Laura	1.90 m (6 ft 3 in)	33 – 28 October 1992
PF	22	(Poland)	Jakubiuk, Anna	1.82 m (6 ft 0 in)	32 – 17 April 1994
G	33	(Serbia)	Popović, Jovana (C)	1.73 m (5 ft 8 in)	36 – 13 March 1990
C	90	(Poland)	Puzio, Dominika	1.87 m (6 ft 2 in)	19 – 14 June 2007
PG	91	(Poland)	Piasecka, Malina	1.68 m (5 ft 6 in)	22 – 19 March 2004
PG	92	(Poland)	Woźna, Iga	1.67 m (5 ft 6 in)	19 – 14 January 2007
C	93	(Poland)	Troszka, Maja	1.90 m (6 ft 3 in)	19 – 19 August 2007
SF	94	(Poland)	Brzustowska, Lena	1.73 m (5 ft 8 in)	19 – 24 June 2007
G/F	95	(Poland)	Główczak, Martyna	1.73 m (5 ft 8 in)	19 – 12 March 2007
PF	96	(Poland)	Wierzbińska, Alicja	1.78 m (5 ft 10 in)	17 – 28 April 2009
PF	97	(Poland)	Wróbel, Maria	1.80 m (5 ft 11 in)	17 – 22 January 2009
PG	98	(Poland)	Stefanowicz, Gabriela	1.70 m (5 ft 7 in)	17 – 20 June 2009
C	99	(Poland)	Haegenbarth, Wiktoria	1.86 m (6 ft 1 in)	19 – 13 February 2007

Head coach

(Polish Basketball Federation) Wojciech Szawarski

Assistant coach(es)

(Polish Basketball Federation) Tomasz Herkt
(Polish Basketball Federation) Radosław Szurgot

Athletic trainer(s)

(Polish Basketball Federation) Łukasz Murdzia

Team manager

(Polish Basketball Federation) Piotr Rawski

Legend

- (C) Team captain
- Injured

- Roster
Updated: October 26, 2026
