= Story Time (sculpture) =

- Artist: Gary Lee Price
- Year: 1993
- Type: Sculpture
- Medium: Bronze sculpture
- Condition: "Well maintained" (1993)
- Location: Corvallis, Oregon, United States; 44.56549°N 123.26455°W
- Owner: City of Corvallis, Corvallis-Benton County Library

Story Time, also known as Storytime, is an outdoor bronze sculpture by Gary Lee Price, installed in Corvallis, Oregon, in the United States.

== Description and history ==
Gary Lee Price's Story Time is installed outside the Corvallis-Benton County Library (645 Northwest Monroe) in Corvallis, Oregon. The bronze sculpture commemorates Jeanne H. Larson, who served as the library's director and staff member from 1948 to 1967, and was funded by the Larson family and other community members. It depicts a boy and a girl sitting back to back with open books in their laps. The boy has his legs crossed and the girl rests the book on her knees. Both children wear plain clothes and the girl's hair is braided. The sculpture measures approximately 2 feet 3 inches (0.69 m) x 5 feet (1.5 m) x 2 feet (0.61 m) and rests on a marble pedestal that measures approximately 3 inches (76 mm) x 5 feet 5 inches (1.65 m) x 1.75 feet (0.53 m). One nearby plaque reads, STORY TIME / GARY PRICE / 1993. Another has the inscription, In Memory of / JEANNE HELEN LARSON (1907–1991) / a passionate champion of libraries and / ROBERT KERMIT LARSON (1899–1991) / her most ardent supporter/from a family enriched by their presence. / In the hope this will help spread / the recognition of the importance / of libraries to the future of our children.

Story Time was dedicated in 1993. The sculpture was surveyed and deemed "well maintained" by Smithsonian Institution's "Save Outdoor Sculpture!" program that same year. It is administered by the City of Corvallis and the Corvallis-Benton County Library.

== See also ==
- 1993 in art
