= Tangerine (Bloor novel) =

1997 young adult novel by Edward Bloor

- First edition
- Author: Edward Bloor
- Language: English
- Published: 1997
- Publisher: Harcourt
- Media type: Hardcover; Paperback; Audio
- Pages: 303 pages
- Followed by: Crusader (Bloor novel)

Tangerine is a young adult novel by Edward Bloor, published in 1997 by Harcourt.

== Plot ==
Paul Fisher and his family move from Houston, Texas to Lake Windsor Downs in Tangerine, Florida. Erik, the older son, looks forward to a football scholarship at the university of his choice. Paul, the younger son, is legally blind but plays soccer. His family credits his visual injury to an incident, which he does not remember, in which he continued to stare at a solar eclipse despite his parents' warnings not to. Soon after they unpack, Paul goes for a tour of his new school, where he meets Mike Costello and his brother Joey. On his first day of school, Paul meets the soccer coach and tries out for the team, but he is later told that his visual impairment prevents his eligibility. One day Mike Costello is killed by lightning; Erik and his friend Arthur Bauer tell jokes after hearing the news, even though Mike was one of their teammates.

While Paul is at school, a field of portable classrooms collapses into a sinkhole. Many people, including Paul and Joey, help rescue those trapped, and no one is seriously injured. The emergency relocation plan gives the students the choice to stay at Lake Windsor, their present school, with a different schedule and more crowded classes, or to transfer to Tangerine Middle School, on the other, poorer side of the county; Paul chooses Tangerine Middle to be able to play soccer again. Paul joins the soccer team. At first, the team captain, Victor, and another player, Tino, hesitate to befriend him, but a victory in the first game of the season convinces Victor to do so.

Throughout the story, houses in Paul's neighborhood are covered with tents to be fumigated for termites.

Tino's older brother, Luis, works at his parents' citrus farm and is developing a new kind of tangerine called the Golden Dawn. While at Paul's house for a school project, Tino makes fun of Erik for falling down while attempting to a kick an extra point during an earlier football game, so Erik punches Tino. Luis goes to Erik's football practice to confront him about hitting his brother. Erik distracts Luis and signals to his friend Arthur to strike Luis from behind using a blackjack. The attack is witnessed by Paul, and Luis is found dead six days later from an aneurysm. Paul stays away from the funeral and grieves alone.

On Senior Awards Night, Tino and Victor attack Erik and Arthur as revenge for killing Luis. The football coach restrains Tino, but Paul distracts the coach by jumping on his back, so that Tino and Victor can escape. Paul runs back to his house, where a confrontation with a furious Arthur and Erik causes Paul to finally fully recall the memory he had been repressing: When Paul was young, Erik had spray-painted a wall and gotten in trouble for it. Erik incorrectly believed that Paul had turned him in (it was actually another kid), so he restrained Paul while Vincent Castor (his lackey at the time, mirroring Erik's relationship with Arthur) sprayed white paint into Paul's eyes as a twisted form of punishment, resulting in his blindness. Paul confronts his parents with the truth. His mother cries and says that they covered up Erik's actions because they did not want Paul to hate his brother. Paul asks whether they thought Paul hating himself instead would be better, which causes his father to cry.

Later, Paul's mother finds some items that had gone missing from the houses in the neighborhood. They hold a meeting to reveal that Erik and Arthur stole the missing items. Paul's father presents a restitution plan proposed by the sheriff, which, if signed by all the robbery victims, would result in all the victims being compensated in exchange for Erik and Arthur not having criminal charges pressed against them. Reluctantly, the victims agree. As they leave the meeting, they find the police waiting outside to arrest Erik and Arthur for killing Luis. Paul tells the cops what he saw instead of covering for his brother. The police arrest Arthur, while Erik is placed under house arrest. Paul gives the police a full statement to help convict both boys for their crimes.

Shortly afterward, it was found that Antoine Thomas, one of the star players and quarterback on the Lake Windsor team, actually lived in Tangerine, causing all of the football team's records to be nullified, and destroying Erik's football legacy.

Back at the school, Paul and his mother meet with the principal, who informs him that Tino and Victor have been suspended for three weeks for attacking Erik and Arthur at a school event. Since Paul attacked the coach, he was expelled from all public schools in the county. As Paul and his mother leave the school, the kids outside express approval towards him for his effort to defend Tino and Victor.

Paul is enrolled in St. Anthony's, a Catholic private school, his only choice after his expulsion. The book ends with Paul being driven to his third school of the year by his father, thinking about Mike Costello and Luis and taking in the sight and smell of the orange groves. He gets emotional just thinking about what had happened to them and the effects it had on their families.

== Characters ==
Paul has a strong moral compass and supports underdog characters.

Tangerine has been praised for having complex characters.

== Themes ==
Themes in the book include social cliques in schools, the need for environmental protection, and bigotry.

== Awards ==
- Rebecca Caudill Young Reader's Book Award Nominee (2001)
- South Carolina Book Award for Junior Book Award (2000)
- Michigan Library Association Thumbs Up! Award Nominee (1998)
- American Library Association's Top Ten Books for Young Adults (1998)

== Related books ==
Bloor wrote a 2015 sequel featuring Paul, Goalkeeper.
