= Feyonda Fitzgerald =

American basketball player (born 1995)

AZS Poznań
- Position: Shooting guard
- League: Basket Liga Kobiet

Personal information
- Born: April 15, 1995 (age 31) Norfolk, Virginia, U.S.
- Listed height: 170 cm (5 ft 7 in)
- Listed weight: 63 kg (139 lb)

Career information
- High school: Lake Taylor (Norfolk, Virginia)
- College: Temple (2013–2017)
- WNBA draft: 2017: 2nd round, 20th overall pick
- Drafted by: Indiana Fever
- Playing career: 2017–present

Career history
- 2017: Connecticut Sun
- 2017–2018: AZS Lublin
- 2018–2019: Pallacanestro Vigarano
- 2019–2020: Ramat HaSharon
- 2020–2021: Energa Toruń
- 2021-2022: CCC Polkowice
- 2022: Panathinaikos
- 2022–2023: Antalya 07 Basketbol
- 2024–2025: Hapoel Petah Tikva
- 2025: Panteras de Aguascalientes
- 2025–2026: Panathinaikos
- 2026–present: AZS Poznań

Career highlights
- First-team All-AAC (2017); AAC All-Freshman Team (2014)
- Stats at Basketball Reference

Feyonda Rena Fitzgerald (born April 15, 1995) is an American professional basketball player for AZS Poznań of the Basket Liga Kobiet.

== Career ==
=== Temple ===
Fitzgerald played for four years for Temple, averaging 13.6 points per game and 4.7 assists per game. In December 2019, she was named espnW's player of the week. She helped the Owls beat Rutgers and DePaul, ranked number 17 at the time. It was the Owls' first win against a ranked non-conference team in almost a decade. Fitzgerald scored twenty-five points in the game against the Blue Demons with fifteen coming in the final quarter.

=== WNBA ===
Fitzgerald was selected in the second round of the 2017 WNBA draft (20th overall) by the Indiana Fever. She was with the Connecticut Sun for two games, before she was waived. She signed a training camp contract in February 2023 with the Chicago Sky, which turned into a contract, but she was waived by the Sky in May.

=== Europe ===
She played for Panathinaikos in the Greek League in the second half of the 2021–22 season.

== Career statistics ==
Legend
GP	Games played	GS	Games started	MPG	Minutes per game	RPG	Rebounds per game
APG	Assists per game	SPG	Steals per game	BPG	Blocks per game	PPG	Points per game
TO	Turnovers per game	FG%	Field-goal percentage	3P%	3-point field-goal percentage	FT%	Free-throw percentage
**Bold**	Career best	°	League leader

=== WNBA ===
==== Regular season ====
Year	Team	GP	GS	MPG	FG%	3P%	FT%	RPG	APG	SPG	BPG	TO	PPG
2017	Connecticut	2	0	4.0	0.0	0.0	0.0	2.0	0.5	0.0	0.0	0.5	0.0
Career	1 year, 1 team	2	0	4.0	0.0	0.0	0.0	2.0	0.5	0.0	0.0	0.5	0.0

=== College ===
Legend
GP	Games played	GS	Games started	MPG	Minutes per game
FG%	Field goal percentage	3P%	3-point field goal percentage	FT%	Free throw percentage
RPG	Rebounds per game	APG	Assists per game	SPG	Steals per game
BPG	Blocks per game	PPG	Points per game	**Bold**	Career high

Year	Team	GP	Points	FG%	3P%	FT%	RPG	APG	SPG	BPG	PPG
2013–14	Temple Owls	34	386	33.0	27.2	78.9	3.4	3.8	0.7	**0.2**	12.9
2014–15	Temple Owls	31	409	32.2	28.4	74.8	3.1	2.8	1.5	0.1	11.1
2015–16	Temple Owls	38	476	34.2	26.8	78.6	3.4	5.3	**1.6**	0.1	13.6
2016–17	Temple Owls	**45**	**553**	**39.4**	**32.1**	**82.7**	**3.5**	**7.3**	0.8	0	**17.3**
Career	Temple Owls	134	1824	34.8	28.7	79.1	3.3	4.7	1.2	0.1	13.6
