= Blanca Millán =

Spanish basketball player

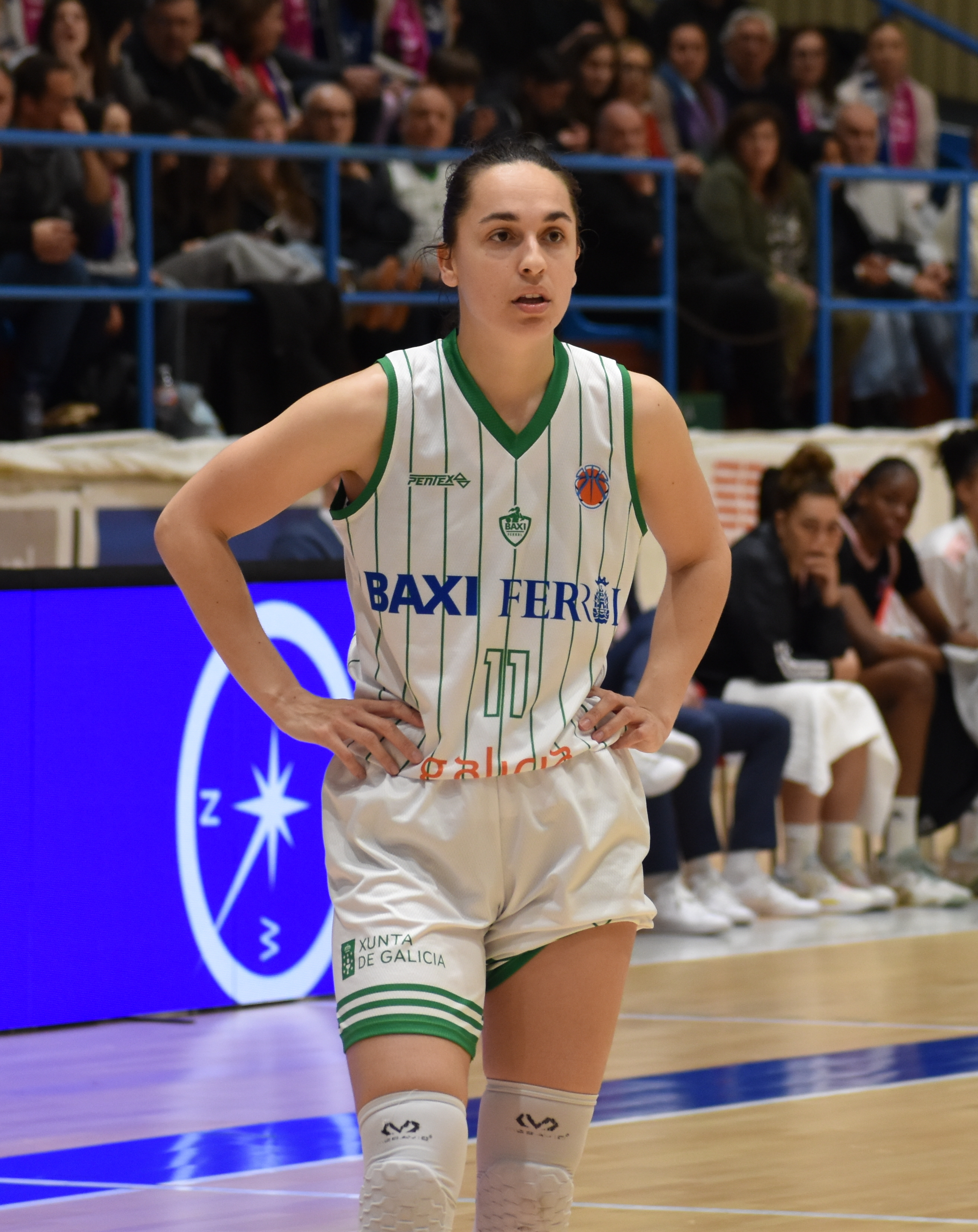
- Blanca Millán in 2025

CB Islas Canarias
- Position: Guard
- League: Liga Femenina de Baloncesto

Personal information
- Born: May 18, 1998 (age 28) Santiago de Compostela, Spain
- Listed height: 6 ft 1 in (1.85 m)

Career information
- College: Maine (2016–2021)

Career highlights
- 2x AEC Player of the Year (2019, 2021); 2x AEC Defensive Player of the Year (2019, 2021); 3x First-team All-AEC (2018, 2019, 2021); 3x AEC All-Defensive Team (2018, 2019, 2021); AEC All-Freshman Team (2017)
- Stats at Basketball Reference

Blanca Millán (born 18 May 1998) is a Spanish basketball player with CB Islas Canarias of the Liga Femenina de Baloncesto. While playing for the Maine Black Bears women's basketball team from 2016 to 2021, Millan became one of the most accomplished players in team and conference history. She is a two-time America East Player of the Year and America East Defensive Player of the Year (2019, 2021). She is the only woman in America East history to win AE Player of the Year and Defensive Player of the Year each twice.

On 18 April 2021, she signed a training camp contract with the Washington Mystics of the WNBA before being waived on 5 May.

== Career statistics ==
Legend
GP	Games played	GS	Games started	MPG	Minutes per game	FG%	Field goal percentage	3P%	3-point field goal percentage
FT%	Free throw percentage	RPG	Rebounds per game	APG	Assists per game	SPG	Steals per game	BPG	Blocks per game
TO	Turnovers per game	PPG	Points per game	**Bold**	Career high	*	Led Division I

=== College ===
Year	Team	GP	GS	MPG	FG%	3P%	FT%	RPG	APG	SPG	BPG	TO	PPG
2016–17	Maine	**34**	**34**	27.2	43.5	30.8	65.0	2.9	1.7	1.8	0.3	**1.3**	8.6
2017–18	Maine	33	33	34.7	44.4	**35.4**	67.1	5.1	1.6	**3.0**	0.7	2.0	17.5
2018–19	Maine	33	33	34.2	41.9	27.2	71.1	4.4	2.1	2.8	**1.4**	2.2	17.2°
2019–20	Maine	6	6	30.0	38.9	18.2	**84.6**	6.3	1.2	2.3	0.3	2.7	18.2
2020–21	Maine	20	20	**35.6**	**47.9**	35.3	78.0	**7.5**	**2.3**	2.9	0.7	1.9	**21.4**°
**Career**		126	126	32.5	43.9	31.0	72.9	4.8	1.8	2.6	0.8	1.9	15.7
Statistics retrieved from Sports-Reference.
