= Japreece Dean =

American basketball player

Personal information
- Born: June 4, 1996 (age 30) Austin, Texas, U.S.
- Listed height: 5 ft 7 in (1.70 m)

Career information
- High school: Vista Ridge (Cedar Park, Texas)
- College: Texas Tech (2015–2017); UCLA (2017–2020)
- WNBA draft: 2020: 3rd round, 30th overall pick
- Drafted by: Chicago Sky
- Playing career: 2020–present
- Position: Point guard

Career highlights
- 2× First-team All-Pac-12 (2019, 2020); Big 12 All-Freshman Team (2016)
- Stats at Basketball Reference

Japreece Monet Dean (born June 4, 1996) is an American professional basketball player.

Dean completed her college career with the UCLA Bruins of the University of California, Los Angeles in 2020. Before transferring to UCLA in 2017, she played two seasons for Texas Tech. In high school, Dean played for Vista Ridge High School in Cedar Park, Texas.

== Career statistics ==
Legend
GP	Games played	GS	Games started	MPG	Minutes per game	RPG	Rebounds per game
APG	Assists per game	SPG	Steals per game	BPG	Blocks per game	PPG	Points per game
TO	Turnovers per game	FG%	Field-goal percentage	3P%	3-point field-goal percentage	FT%	Free-throw percentage
**Bold**	Career best	°	League leader

=== College ===
Year	Team	GP	GS	MPG	FG%	3P%	FT%	RPG	APG	SPG	BPG	TO	PPG
2015–16	Texas Tech	31	25	32.6	35.7	26.1	80.6	3.3	3.3	1.3	0.1	3.1	12.5
2016–17	Texas Tech	2	2	33.0	31.3	**40.0**	0.0	2.0	3.5	**2.0**	0.0	2.5	6.0
2017–18	UCLA	26	1	23.4	**36.2**	35.1	68.8	1.9	2.3	0.7	0.0	**1.0**	7.7
2018–19	UCLA	**35**	**34**	**34.4**	35.9	35.2	**92.2**	3.3	4.9	0.9	**0.2**	2.8	**14.1**
2019–20	UCLA	29	29	33.9	32.6	25.6	84.1	**3.7**	**5.5**	1.4	0.0	2.5	13.6
**Career**		123	91	31.5	34.9	31.0	85.0	3.1	4.1	1.1	0.1	2.4	12.1
Statistics retrieved from Sports-Reference.

== Family ==
Dean has two brothers. Her mother is a former college basketball player who played for Frank Phillips College in Borger, Texas. Her father is a former high school basketball scout.
