= Alexis Prince =

American basketball player (born 1994)

Free agent
- Position: Shooting guard

Personal information
- Born: February 5, 1994 (age 32) Jacksonville, Florida
- Listed height: 6 ft 2 in (1.88 m)
- Listed weight: 178 lb (81 kg)

Career information
- High school: Edgewater (Orlando, Florida)
- College: Baylor (2012–2017)
- WNBA draft: 2017: 3rd round, 29th overall pick
- Drafted by: Phoenix Mercury
- Playing career: 2017–present

Career history
- 2017: Phoenix Mercury
- 2018: Atlanta Dream
- 2018–2019: Tarbes Gespe Bigorre
- 2020: Chicago Sky
- 2020–2023: Hatayspor
- 2023–2024: CB Avenida
- 2024–2025: Elitzur Ramla
- 2025: Phoenix Mercury
- 2025–: Athinaikos

Career highlights
- Big 12 All-Defensive Team (2017); Big 12 All-Freshman Team (2013); McDonald's All-American Game MVP (2012)
- Stats at WNBA.com
- Stats at Basketball Reference
Medals
Women's Basketball
Representing United States
FIBA Under-18 Americas Championship
Gold medal – first place	2012 Puerto Rico	Team

Alexis Prince (born February 5, 1994) is an American professional basketball player for Athinaikos from Greek League.

== High school career ==
Prince was a four-year starter at Edgewater High School in Orlando, Florida, where she won numerous awards including Miss Florida Basketball. She played college basketball at Baylor University. As a high school player at Edgewater High School, Prince was named McDonald's and Parade All-American.

== Professional career ==
In August 2024, Prince signed with the Israeli champions Elitzur Ramla, until the end of the season. she replaced Adut Bulgak.

== Career statistics ==
=== WNBA ===
Legend
GP	Games played	GS	Games started	MPG	Minutes per game	RPG	Rebounds per game
APG	Assists per game	SPG	Steals per game	BPG	Blocks per game	PPG	Points per game
TO	Turnovers per game	FG%	Field-goal percentage	3P%	3-point field-goal percentage	FT%	Free-throw percentage
**Bold**	Career best	°	League leader

==== Regular season ====
Stats current through game on May 17, 2025

WNBA regular season statistics
Year	Team	GP	GS	MPG	FG%	3P%	FT%	RPG	APG	SPG	BPG	TO	PPG
2017	Phoenix	**18**	0	7.2	34.1	31.3	**100.0**	1.0	0.4	**0.2**	0.2	0.2	1.9
2018	Atlanta	2	0	3.0	**60.0**	**100.0**	—	1.0	0.0	0.0	0.0	**0.0**	3.5
2019	Did not appear in league												
2020	Chicago	2	0	8.0	**60.0**	66.7	—	1.5	0.0	0.0	**0.5**	**0.0**	**4.0**
2025	Phoenix	1	0	**22.0**	33.3	0.0	—	**8.0**	**1.0**	0.0	0.0	3.0	2.0
**Career**	4 years, 3 teams	23	0	7.6	38.9	38.1	100.0	1.3	0.3	0.2	0.2	0.3	2.3

==== Playoffs ====
Year	Team	GP	GS	MPG	FG%	3P%	FT%	RPG	APG	SPG	BPG	TO	PPG
2017	Phoenix	**2**	0	0.5	0.0	0.0	0.0	0.0	0.0	0.0	0.0	0.5	0.0
2020	Chicago	1	0	**9.0**	**100.0**	**100.0**	0.0	0.0	0.0	0.0	**1.0**	**0.0**	**3.0**
Career	2 years, 2 teams	3	0	3.3	100.0	100.0	0.0	0.0	0.0	0.0	0.3	0.3	1.0

=== College ===
Legend
GP	Games played	GS	Games started	MPG	Minutes per game
FG%	Field goal percentage	3P%	3-point field goal percentage	FT%	Free throw percentage
RPG	Rebounds per game	APG	Assists per game	SPG	Steals per game
BPG	Blocks per game	PPG	Points per game	**Bold**	Career high

Year	Team	GP	Points	FG%	3P%	FT%	RPG	APG	SPG	BPG	PPG
2012–13	Baylor	34	173	39.0%	28.6%	56.5%	2.4	1.2	0.5	0.5	5.1
2013–14	Baylor	4	25	**52.2%**	12.5%	–	2.3	0.8	–	**1.0**	6.3
2014–15	Baylor	37	318	42.0%	36.4%	63.6%	4.1	1.7	0.8	0.6	8.6
2015–16	Baylor	24	144	34.5%	31.3%	**75.0%**	3.8	1.5	**0.9**	0.8	6.0
2016–17	Baylor	**37**	**446**	46.9%	**41.6%**	66.7%	**5.8**	**2.4**	0.6	0.9	**12.1**
Career		136	1106	42.4%	36.1%	66.1%	4.0	1.7	0.7	0.7	8.1
