= 2021–22 Galatasaray S.K. (women's basketball) season =

Turkish basketball season

Galatasaray
2021–22 season
- President: Burak Elmas
- Head coach: Efe Güven
- Arena: Şehit Mustafa Özel Spor Kompleksi
- Women's Basketball Super League: 5th seed
- Playoffs: Quarterfinals
- EuroLeague Women: 7th (Group B)
- Turkish Women's Basketball Cup: Quarterfinals
- EuroCup Women: 3rd

The 2021–22 season is Galatasaray's 67th season in the existence of the club. The team plays in the Women's Basketball Super League and in the EuroLeague Women.

== Sponsorship and kit manufacturers ==
- Supplier: Galatasaray Store
- Main sponsor: Nef
- Back sponsor: —
- Sleeve sponsor: —
- Short sponsor: Mixmey
- Socks sponsor: —

== Team ==
=== Players ===
Galatasaray roster
Players
Coaches

Pos.	No.	Nat.	Name	Ht.	Wt.	Age
PG	1	(Turkey)	Şahin, Eda	1.69 m (5 ft 7 in)		27 – 26 August 1999
SF	3	(United States)	Davis, Kaela	1.88 m (6 ft 2 in)	77 kg (170 lb)	31 – 15 March 1995
PF	4	(Turkey)	Tokmak, Simge	1.84 m (6 ft 0 in)		23 – 23 January 2003
SF	5	(Turkey)	Gülcan, Melis	1.86 m (6 ft 1 in)		30 – 28 May 1996
PF	6	(Turkey)	Balotu, Miray	1.83 m (6 ft 0 in)		25 – 8 April 2001
SG	7	(Turkey)	Albayrak, Mısra	1.75 m (5 ft 9 in)		25 – 10 October 2000
SF	8	(Turkey)	Yılmaz, Sude	1.82 m (6 ft 0 in)		24 – 15 March 2002
G	9	(Turkey)	Bilgiç, Pelin (C)	1.73 m (5 ft 8 in)		32 – 15 July 1994
C	12	(Latvia)	Šteinberga, Anete (injured)	1.91 m (6 ft 3 in)	80 kg (176 lb)	36 – 29 January 1990
F	13	(Turkey)	Vardar, Arifecan	1.85 m (6 ft 1 in)		23 – 12 January 2003
C	14	(Turkey)	Başaran, Gizem	1.93 m (6 ft 4 in)		34 – 28 September 1992
C	15	(Serbia)	Krajišnik, Tina	1.91 m (6 ft 3 in)		35 – 12 January 1991
PG	17	(Turkey)	Yavuz, Gizem	1.70 m (5 ft 7 in)		38 – 10 March 1988
F	21	(Turkey)	Şahin, Berna			23 – 21 January 2003
PG	23	(Turkey)	Aydın, Merve	1.75 m (5 ft 9 in)	58 kg (128 lb)	32 – 10 March 1994
PF	30	(United States) (Slovenia)	Evans, Shante	1.85 m (6 ft 1 in)	106 kg (234 lb)	35 – 8 July 1991

Head coach

- (Turkey) Efe Güven

Assistant coach(es)

- (Turkey) Batuhan Atiktürk
- (Turkey) Emre Beşer
- (Turkey) Can Alyüz

Athletic trainer(s)

- (Turkey) Süleyman Görgülü

Legend

- (C) Team captain
- (DC) Dual citizenship
- Injured

- Roster
Updated: April 10, 2022

=== Depth chart ===
Pos.	Starting 5	Bench 1	Bench 2	Inactive
C	Tina Krajišnik	Gizem Başaran		Anete Šteinberga (injured)
PF	Shante Evans	Miray Balotu	Simge Tokmak	Arifecan Vardar
SF	Kaela Davis	Melis Gülcan	Sude Yılmaz	Berna Şahin
SG	Merve Aydın	Mısra Albayrak
PG	Pelin Bilgiç	Gizem Yavuz	Eda Şahin

=== Squad changes ===
==== In ====
No.	Pos.	Nat.	Name	Age	Moving from		Type	Ends	Transfer fee	Date	Source
15	C	(Serbia)	Tina Krajišnik	30	Sopron Basket	(Hungary)	1 years	June 2022	Free	18 May 2021	
5	F	(Turkey)	Melis Gülcan	24	Kayseri Basketbol	(Turkey)	1 years	June 2022	Free	19 May 2021	
17	G	(Turkey)	Gizem Yavuz	33	Çankaya University	(Turkey)	1 years	June 2022	Free	20 May 2021	
14	C	(Turkey)	Gizem Başaran	28	Hatay Büyükşehir Belediyespor	(Turkey)	1 years	June 2022	Free	20 May 2021	
33	SG	(United States)	Chelsea Dungee	24	Dallas Wings	(United States)	1 years	June 2022	Free	20 May 2021	
2	G	(United States)	Riquna Williams	30	Las Vegas Aces	(United States)	1 years	June 2022	Free	21 May 2021	
23	G	(Turkey)	Merve Aydın	27	Alter Enersun Al-Qázeres Extremadura	(Spain)	1 years	June 2022	Free	19 August 2021	
3	SF	(United States)	Kaela Davis	26	CDB Clarinos Tenerife	(Spain)	1 years	June 2022	Free	19 November 2021	
10	PG	(United States)	Kelsey Plum	27	Las Vegas Aces	(United States)	6 months	June 2022	Free	15 January 2022	
30	PF	(United States)	Shante Evans	30	Perfumerias Avenida	(Spain)	4 months	June 2022	Free	7 February 2022	

==== Out ====
No.	Pos.	Nat.	Name	Age	Moving to		Type	Transfer fee	Date	Source
0	PG	(Turkey)	Asena Yalçın	33	Çukurova Basketbol	(Turkey)	End of contract	Free	17 May 2021	
13	C	(United States)	Quanitra Hollingsworth	32	Çukurova Basketbol	(Turkey)	End of contract	Free	17 May 2021	
11	PG	(Russia)	Epiphanny Prince	33	Seattle Storm	(United States)	End of contract	Free	June 2021	
21	C	(United States)	Mercedes Russell	25	Seattle Storm	(United States)	End of contract	Free	June 2021	
7	SF	(Turkey)	Cansu Köksal	27	Beşiktaş HDI Sigorta	(Turkey)	End of contract	Free	16 July 2021	
33	G/F	(United States)	Chelsea Dungee	24	Sydney Uni Flames	(Australia)	Contract termination	Free	8 November 2021	
2	G	(United States)	Riquna Williams	31			Contract termination	Free	12 January 2022	
10	PG	(United States)	Kelsey Plum	27	Las Vegas Aces	(United States)	End of contract	Free	9 April 2022	

=== Coach ===
Nat.	Name	Age.	Previous team		Type	Ends	Date	Source
(Turkey)	Efe Güven	41	Galatasaray (assistant)	(Turkey)	1 years	2022	17 May 2021	

=== On loan ===
Pos.	Nat.	Name	Age	Moving from		Moving to		Date	Contract	Ends	Source
PF	(Turkey)	Meltem Yıldızhan	21	Galatasaray	(Turkey)	Nesibe Aydın GSK	(Turkey)	25 May 2021	1 years	June 2022	

=== Staff and management ===
As of 4 December 2021

Name	Job
Zeynepgül Onay Ene	Managing Director
Müge Erdem	Infrastructure Administrative Coordinator
Efe Güven	Head Coach
Melahat Aydın	Administrative Manager
Batuhan Atiktürk	Assistant Coach
Emre Beşer	Assistant Coach
Can Alyüz	Assistant Coach
Süleyman Görgülü	Conditioner
Pelin Yılmaz	Physiotherapist
Zerrin Hatacıkoğlu	Masseuse
Alaaddin Akkoyun	Material Manager
Özcan Kör	Transportation

== Competitions ==
=== Overview ===
Competition	First match	Last match	Starting round	Final position	Record							
Competition	First match	Last match	Starting round	Final position	Pld	W	D	L	PF	PA	PD	Win %
Women's Basketball Super League	16 October 2021	25 April 2022	Regular season	Quarterfinals	28	17	0	11	2,006	1,879	+127	60.71
EuroLeague Women	6 October 2021	2 February 2022	Regular season	7th (Group B)	14	5	0	9	968	1,038	−70	35.71
EuroCup Women	10 March 2022	7 April 2022	Quarterfinals	3rd	4	3	0	1	306	265	+41	75.00
Turkish Women's Basketball Cup	22 March 2022	22 March 2022	Quarterfinals	Quarterfinals	1	0	0	1	68	74	−6	0.00
Total					47	25	0	22	3,348	3,256	+92	53.19

Last updated: April 25, 2022
Source: Competitions

=== Women's Basketball Super League ===
==== League table ====
Pos	Team	Pld	W	L	PF	PA	PD	Pts	Qualification or relegation
1	Fenerbahçe (P, O)	26	24	2	2321	1589	+732	50	Qualification to playoffs
2	Çukurova Basketbol (P, O)	26	20	6	2066	1682	+384	46	Qualification to playoffs
3	Ormanspor (P, O)	26	20	6	2069	1822	+247	46	Qualification to playoffs
4	Nesibe Aydın (P, O)	26	18	8	1988	1845	+143	44	Qualification to playoffs
5	Galatasaray (P, O)	26	17	9	1878	1732	+146	43	Qualification to playoffs
6	BOTAŞ (P, O)	26	15	11	1992	1848	+144	41	Qualification to playoffs
7	Bursa Büyükşehir Belediyespor (P, O)	26	13	13	1846	1987	−141	39	Qualification to playoffs
8	Çankaya Üniversitesi (P, O)	26	11	15	1982	2078	−96	37	Qualification to playoffs
9	Beşiktaş	26	11	15	1881	1947	−66	37	
10	Hatayspor	26	9	17	1976	2113	−137	35	
11	Antalya 07 Basketbol	26	8	18	1668	1956	−288	34	
12	Kayseri Basketbol	26	7	19	1801	2026	−225	33	
13	İzmit Belediyespor (R)	26	7	19	1830	2078	−248	33	Relegation to TKBL
14	Elazığ İl Özel İdarespor (R)	26	2	24	1643	2238	−595	28	Relegation to TKBL

Updated to match(es) played on April 19, 2022. Source: TBF
(O) Play-off winners; (P) Promoted; (R) Relegated

==== Results summary ====
Overall						Home					Away				
Pld	W	L	PF	PA	PD	W	L	PF	PA	PD	W	L	PF	PA	PD
26	17	9	1878	1732	+146	8	5	876	782	+94	9	4	1002	950	+52

Last updated: April 19, 2022.
Source: TBF.org.tr

==== Results by round ====
Round	1	2	3	4	5	6	7	8	9	10	11	12	13	14	15	16	17	18	19	20	21	22	23	24	25	26
Ground	A	H	A	A	H	A	H	A	H	H	H	A	H	H	A	H	H	A	H	A	H	A	A	A	H	A
Result	W	W	L	L	W	W	W	W	L	L	W	L	L	L	W	W	L	W	W	L	W	W	W	W	W	W
Position	6	3	6	6	5	5	5	4	6	6	6	6	6	6	7	7	7	6	7	6	6	7	7	7	5	5

Updated to match(es) played on April 16, 2022. Source: TBF.org.tr
A = Away; H = Home; W = Win; L = Loss

==== Matches ====
Win Loss

Note: All times are TRT (UTC+3) as listed by the Turkish Basketball Federation.

16 October 2021 1	Botaş	65–71	Galatasaray	Ankara
16:30	Scoring by quarter: 18–21, 24–13, 14–14, 9–23
Galatasaray TV, Tivibu Spor	Pts: Dubljević 19; Rebs: Putniņa 10; Asts: Dubljević 5 PIR: Dubljević 24	Boxscore	Pts: Šteinberga 22; Rebs: Krajišnik 13; Asts: Bilgiç 8 PIR: Šteinberga 25	Arena: Ankara Dsi Spor Salonu; Referees: Alper Altuğ Köselerli, Sedar Saraç, Gürkan Demir

23 October 2021 2	Galatasaray	66–54	Çankaya Üniversitesi	Yenibosna, Bahçelievler, Istanbul
16:30	Scoring by quarter: 23–10, 19–19, 18–13, 6–12
Galatasaray TV, Tivibu Spor	Pts: Williams 18; Rebs: Williams, Aydın 7 Asts: four players 2 PIR: Williams 21	Boxscore	Pts: Dikaioulaku 16; Rebs: Prince 11; Asts: White 4 PIR: Prince 14	Arena: Şehit Mustafa Özel Spor Kompleksi; Referees: Zafer Yılmaz, Eyyüp Ayhan, Samet Tekin

30 October 2021 3	Fenerbahçe Safiport	74–56	Galatasaray	Istanbul
16:30	Scoring by quarter: 18–17, 22–11, 14–17, 20–11
Galatasaray TV, Tivibu Spor	Pts: Iagupova 19; Rebs: Iagupova 9 Asts: Çakır 7 PIR: Iagupova, Stokes 16	Boxscore	Pts: Williams 18; Rebs: Krajišnik 12; Asts: Williams 5 PIR: Bilgiç 18	Arena: Fenerbahçe Metro Enerji Spor Salonu; Referees: Yener Yılmaz, Kerem Yılmaz, Nazlı Çisil Güngör

6 November 2021 4	ÇBK Mersin Yenişehir Belediyesi	74–72	Galatasaray	Mersin
13:00	Scoring by quarter: 25–22, 18–19, 17–20, 14–11
Galatasaray TV, Tivibu Spor	Pts: Zellous 26; Rebs: Zellous 10; Asts: Zellous 7 PIR: Zellous 33	Boxscore	Pts: Šteinberga 27; Rebs: Williams 13; Asts: Bilgiç 5 PIR: Šteinberga 23	Arena: Servet Tazegül Arena; Referees: Osman Sinan İşgüder, İzel Deniz Pehlivan, Haldun Çoban

20 November 2021 5	Galatasaray	72–45	Antalya 07 Basketbol	Yenibosna, Bahçelievler, Istanbul
13:00	Scoring by quarter: 21–10, 20–12, 18–13, 13–10
Tivibu Spor	Pts: Krajišnik 13; Rebs: Šteinberga 8 Asts: Williams 4 PIR: Krajišnik 20	Boxscore	Pts: Davis 14; Rebs: Davis, Ivanković 8 Asts: Jones 3 PIR: Davis 11	Arena: Şehit Mustafa Özel Spor Kompleksi; Referees: Fatih Arslanoğlu, Cemil Uygül, Münevver Özemre

28 November 2021 6	Hatayspor	76–81	Galatasaray	Hatay
13:30	Scoring by quarter: 19–13, 16–26, 31–14, 10–28
Youtube / TBF TV	Pts: Brown 27; Rebs: Brown 9 Asts: Akbaş, Ellenberg-Wiley 5 PIR: Brown 30	Boxscore	Pts: Williams 19; Rebs: Šteinberga 9 Asts: Aydın 7 PIR: Williams 24	Arena: Antakya Spor Salonu; Referees: Aytuğ Ekti, Anıl Veziroğlu, Yarkın Keskin

4 December 2021 7	Galatasaray	67–49	Nesibe Aydın	Yenibosna, Bahçelievler, Istanbul
13:00	Scoring by quarter: 14–11, 19–14, 16–16, 18–8
Tivibu Spor	Pts: Gülcan 17; Rebs: Gülcan 11; Asts: Bilgiç 6 PIR: Gülcan 19	Boxscore	Pts: Coates 25; Rebs: Coates 18; Asts: Thomas 4 PIR: Coates 37	Arena: Şehit Mustafa Özel Spor Kompleksi; Referees: Emin Moğulkoç, İbrahim Altıntaş, Burak Durmuş

11 December 2021 8	UMF Yapı İzmit Belediyespor	69–80	Galatasaray	Kocaeli
17:00	Scoring by quarter: 12–13, 8–22, 22–21, 27–24
Youtube / TBF TV	Pts: Korkmaz, Dikmenoğulları 16; Rebs: Higgins 8 Asts: Solopova, Korkmaz 4 PIR: Higgins 16	Boxscore	Pts: Krajišnik 15; Rebs: Krajišnik 13; Asts: Williams 6 PIR: Yılmaz 22	Arena: Şehit Polis Recep Topaloğlu Spor Salonu; Referees: Burak Yılmaz, Mehmet Onur Sönmez, Samet Tekin

18 December 2021 9	Galatasaray	61–65	OGM Ormanspor	Yenibosna, Bahçelievler, Istanbul
16:30	Scoring by quarter: 19–19, 11–10, 13–20, 18–16
Tivibu Spor	Pts: Krajišnik 20; Rebs: Krajišnik 11; Asts: Gülcan 5 PIR: Krajišnik 25	Boxscore	Pts: McCowan 25; Rebs: McCowan 12; Asts: three players 5 PIR: McCowan 40	Arena: Şehit Mustafa Özel Spor Kompleksi; Referees: Erhan Gürsel, Halil Erkoç, Muzaffer Vardarlı

25 December 2021 10	Galatasaray	57–66	Beşiktaş HDI Sigorta	Yenibosna, Bahçelievler, Istanbul
13:00	Scoring by quarter: 15–20, 19–6, 10–23, 13–17
Tivibu Spor	Pts: Davis 17; Rebs: Krajišnik 11; Asts: Bilgiç 6 PIR: Gülcan 14	Boxscore	Pts: McCall 18; Rebs: McCall 11; Asts: Yavaş 8 PIR: McCall 35	Arena: Şehit Mustafa Özel Spor Kompleksi; Referees: Fatih Arslanoğlu, Mesut Öztürk, Dorukhan Kalyoncu

29 December 2021 11	Galatasaray	58–43	Elazığ İl Özel İdare	Yenibosna, Bahçelievler, Istanbul
17:00	Scoring by quarter: 22–10, 9–10, 11–17, 16–6
Tivibu Spor	Pts: Krajišnik 15; Rebs: Krajišnik 14; Asts: Bilgiç 6 PIR: Davis 16	Boxscore	Pts: Pulliam 17; Rebs: Mokango 9 Asts: Vintsilaiou 4 PIR: Vintsilaiou 10	Arena: Şehit Mustafa Özel Spor Kompleksi; Referees: Polat Parlak, Niyazi Yasin Kahraman, Burak Durmuş

16 February 2022 12	Bursa Büyükşehir Belediyespor	58–55	Galatasaray	Bursa
16:00	Scoring by quarter: 12–12, 16–15, 19–12, 11–16
Tivibu Spor	Pts: Macaulay 17; Rebs: Arı 10; Asts: Cuic 4 PIR: Macaulay 18	Boxscore	Pts: Davis 20; Rebs: Davis 7 Asts: Bilgiç 8 PIR: Davis 24	Arena: Naim Süleymanoğlu Spor Kompleksi; Referees: Aytuğ Ekti, Uğur Özen, İzel Deniz Pehlivan
Note: The game, originally scheduled for 3 January 2022, was postponed due to a COVID-19 outbreak within Galatasaray's squad.

12 January 2022 13	Galatasaray	58–61	Bellona Kayseri Basketbol	Yenibosna, Bahçelievler, Istanbul
17:00	Scoring by quarter: 19–15, 17–17, 14–14, 8–15
Tivibu Spor	Pts: Davis 19; Rebs: Krajišnik 11; Asts: Bilgiç 7 PIR: Davis 19	Boxscore	Pts: Williams 23; Rebs: Williams 8 Asts: Slocum 6 PIR: Williams 23	Arena: Şehit Mustafa Özel Spor Kompleksi; Referees: Orhan Çağrı Hekimoğlu, Mehmet Onur Sönmez, İsmail Binbir
Note: The game, originally scheduled for 7 January 2022, was postponed due to a COVID-19 outbreak within Galatasaray's squad.

15 January 2022 14	Galatasaray	65–75	Botaş	Yenibosna, Bahçelievler, Istanbul
13:00	Scoring by quarter: 19–23, 11–15, 20–24, 15–13
Tivibu Spor	Pts: Bilgiç 17; Rebs: Krajišnik 9 Asts: Bilgiç 7 PIR: Bilgiç 18	Boxscore	Pts: Cora, Davis 14; Rebs: Davis 6 Asts: Alben 6 PIR: Cora 15	Arena: Şehit Mustafa Özel Spor Kompleksi; Referees: Murat Ciner, Münevver Özemre, Dorukhan Kalyoncu

22 January 2022 15	Çankaya Üniversitesi	86–92	Galatasaray	Ankara
14:00	Scoring by quarter: 32–22, 16–26, 20–19, 18–25
Youtube / TBF TV	Pts: Plum 24; Rebs: Krajišnik 8 Asts: Bilgiç 18; PIR: Gülcan 25	Boxscore	Pts: White 30; Rebs: Prince 14; Asts: White 10; PIR: White 37	Arena: Ankara Spor Salonu; Referees: Ziya Özorhon, Mesut Öztürk, Batuhan Kümükoğlu

23 February 2022 16	Galatasaray	69–63	Fenerbahçe Safiport	Yenibosna, Bahçelievler, Istanbul
19:00	Scoring by quarter: 21–17, 15–16, 10–13, 23–17
Tivibu Spor	Pts: Plum 29; Rebs: Krajišnik 9 Asts: Davis 3 PIR: Plum 20	Boxscore	Pts: Sabally 14; Rebs: Sabally 20; Asts: Çakır 6 PIR: Sabally 23	Arena: Şehit Mustafa Özel Spor Kompleksi; Referees: Mehmet Keseratar, Tunçtan Durmuşcan, Alper Gökçebel

4 February 2022 17	Galatasaray	62–65	ÇBK Mersin Yenişehir Belediyesi	Yenibosna, Bahçelievler, Istanbul
13:00	Scoring by quarter: 14–12, 13–22, 20–13, 15–18
Tivibu Spor	Pts: Krajišnik 21; Rebs: Krajišnik 13; Asts: Bilgiç 5 PIR: Krajišnik 25	Boxscore	Pts: Hayes 26; Rebs: Hollingsworth 10; Asts: Hayes, Thomas 5 PIR: Hayes 21	Arena: Şehit Mustafa Özel Spor Kompleksi; Referees: Serhat Büker, Ahmet Murat Arıkanlı, Sibel Koç

19 February 2022 18	Antalya 07 Basketbol	62–87	Galatasaray	Antalya
14:00	Scoring by quarter: 22–18, 11–23, 14–26, 15–20
Youtube / TBF TV	Pts: Nared 21; Rebs: Davis 11; Asts: Takmaz 5 PIR: Nared 24	Boxscore	Pts: Plum 23; Rebs: Krajišnik 9 Asts: Aydın 5 PIR: Plum 27	Arena: Akdeniz Üniversitesi Gazi Mustafa Kemal Spor Salonu; Referees: Mehmet Şahin, Alper Elçikoca, Mustafa Candemir Tabak

27 February 2022 19	Galatasaray	83–59	Hatayspor	Yenibosna, Bahçelievler, Istanbul
13:00	Scoring by quarter: 28–15, 22–25, 17–9, 16–10
Tivibu Spor	Pts: Plum 21; Rebs: Krajišnik 8 Asts: Plum 6 PIR: Yılmaz 24	Boxscore	Pts: Akbaş 15; Rebs: Akbaş 8 Asts: Akbaş 5 PIR: Akbaş 23	Arena: Şehit Mustafa Özel Spor Kompleksi; Referees: Mehmet Karabilecen, Halil Erkoç, Eyyüp Ayhan

5 March 2022 20	Nesibe Aydın	90–85	Galatasaray	Ankara
16:30	Scoring by quarter: 25–17, 20–12, 23–29, 22–27
Tivibu Spor	Pts: Coates 24; Rebs: three players 5 Asts: Thomas 6 PIR: Coates 31	Boxscore	Pts: Plum 30; Rebs: Krajišnik 10; Asts: Evans 4 PIR: Plum 22	Arena: TOBB ETÜ Spor Salonu; Referees: Zafer Yılmaz, İsmail Binbir, Mehmet Onur Sönmez

16 April 2022 21	Galatasaray	74–63	UMF Yapı İzmit Belediyespor	Yenibosna, Bahçelievler, Istanbul
14:00	Scoring by quarter: 19–23, 17–12, 25–16, 13–12
Youtube / TBF TV	Pts: Bilgiç 17; Rebs: Krajišnik 11; Asts: Gülcan 6 PIR: Krajišnik 21	Boxscore	Pts: Türk 15; Rebs: Türkyılmaz 7 Asts: Fields 5 PIR: Fields 15	Arena: Şehit Mustafa Özel Spor Kompleksi; Referees: Mehmet Şahin, Turgut Işık, Yarkın Keskin

19 March 2022 22	OGM Ormanspor	90–93	Galatasaray	Ankara
13:00	Scoring by quarter: 26–24, 27–31, 14–21, 23–17
Tivibu Spor	Pts: McCowan 22; Rebs: McCowan 14; Asts: Robinson 7 PIR: McCowan 34	Boxscore	Pts: Plum 32; Rebs: Evans 9 Asts: Plum 10; PIR: Plum 34	Arena: M. Sait Zarifoğlu Spor Salonu; Referees: Mehmet Serdar Ünal, Fatih Güler, Serdar Saraç

29 March 2022 23	Beşiktaş HDI Sigorta	65–72	Galatasaray	Istanbul
19:00	Scoring by quarter: 22–22, 12–14, 17–23, 14–13
Tivibu Spor	Pts: McCall 22; Rebs: McCall 12; Asts: Yavaş 6 PIR: McCall 28	Boxscore	Pts: Davis 25; Rebs: Krajišnik 12; Asts: Aydın 6 PIR: Davis, Krajišnik 21	Arena: BJK Akatlar Arena; Referees: Kaan Büyükçil, Kerem Yılmaz, Hande Öztürk

1 April 2022 24	Elazığ İl Özel İdare	69–80	Galatasaray	Elazığ
14:00	Scoring by quarter: 27–26, 19–23, 4–17, 19–14
Youtube / TBF TV	Pts: Cicic 22; Rebs: Cicic 8 Asts: Sönmez, Türk 5 PIR: Cicic 30	Boxscore	Pts: Krajišnik 19; Rebs: Krajišnik 7 Asts: Davis 4 PIR: Krajišnik 28	Arena: Elazığ İl Özel İdare Spor Salonu; Referees: Umut Özgün Ergün, Cemil Uygül, Doğu Berk İnnal

10 April 2022 25	Galatasaray	84–74	Bursa Büyükşehir Belediyespor	Yenibosna, Bahçelievler, Istanbul
14:00	Scoring by quarter: 25–21, 24–18, 21–20, 14–15
Galatasaray TV	Pts: Davis 27; Rebs: Davis 10; Asts: Bilgiç 6 PIR: Davis 36	Boxscore	Pts: Doyle 23; Rebs: Macaulay 9 Asts: Doyle 7 PIR: Doyle 25	Arena: Şehit Mustafa Özel Spor Kompleksi; Referees: Ahmet Tatlıcı, Alper Elçikoca, Samet Tekin

19 April 2022 26	Bellona Kayseri Basketbol	72–78	Galatasaray	Kayseri
17:00	Scoring by quarter: 24–19, 19–15, 17–16, 12–28
Youtube / TBF TV	Pts: Williams 23; Rebs: Abdi 9 Asts: Abdi 4 PIR: Williams 14	Boxscore	Pts: Krajišnik 27; Rebs: Krajišnik 8 Asts: Aydın 7 PIR: Krajišnik 32	Arena: Kadir Has Kongre Merkezi Spor Salonu; Referees: Can Mavisu, Mustafa Candemir Tabak, Burak Durmuş

==== Playoffs ====
===== Quarterfinals =====
Win Loss

Note: All times are TRT (UTC+3) as listed by the Turkish Basketball Federation.

22 April 2022 1	Nesibe Aydın	94–79	Galatasaray	Ankara
14:00	Scoring by quarter: 24–15, 28–23, 18–18, 24–23
Tivibu Spor	Pts: Thomas 21; Rebs: Coates 8 Asts: Thomas 10; PIR: Thomas 27	Boxscore	Pts: Gülcan 21; Rebs: Krajišnik 10; Asts: Bilgiç 6 PIR: Krajišnik 23	Arena: TOBB ETÜ Spor Salonu; Referees: Ali Şakacı, Orkun Yurttaş, Mesut Öztürk

25 April 2022 2	Galatasaray	49–53	Nesibe Aydın	Yenibosna, Bahçelievler, Istanbul
19:00	Scoring by quarter: 16–16, 14–16, 9–12, 10–9
Tivibu Spor	Pts: Gülcan 14; Rebs: Krajišnik 17; Asts: Bilgiç 6 PIR: Krajišnik 14	Boxscore	Pts: Nacickaitė 13; Rebs: Yıldızhan 11; Asts: Thomas 6 PIR: Yıldızhan 15	Arena: Şehit Mustafa Özel Spor Kompleksi; Referees: Murat Ciner, Fatih Güler, Halil Erkoç

=== EuroLeague Women ===
==== Regular season (Group B) ====
Pos	Team	Pld	W	L	PF	PA	PD	Pts	Qualification	FEN	SOP	SCH	KUR	GIR	LAN	GAL	GDY
1	(Turkey) Fenerbahçe	14	11	3	1108	892	+216	25	Advance to quarterfinals		73–47	82–65	83–58	78–57	65–70	107–62	87–67
2	(Hungary) Sopron Basket	14	8	6	935	897	+38	22	Advance to quarterfinals	59–82		67–58	79–72	53–68	76–54	73–44	67–40
3	(Italy) Beretta Famila Schio	14	8	6	1011	966	+45	22	Advance to quarterfinals	64–60	71–70		64–80	68–76	96–56	76–73	75–61
4	(Russia) Dynamo Kursk	14	8	6	1038	1021	+17	22	Excluded	57–63	73–77	74–93		92–75	75–57	78–76	86–76
5	(Spain) Spar Girona	14	7	7	972	977	−5	21	Advance to quarterfinals	71–59	63–68	65–55	66–71		70–78	55–69	80–70
6	(France) Basket Landes	14	7	7	966	1050	−84	21	Transfer to EuroCup Women	76–93	61–52	64–79	78–75	71–80		71–62	79–70
7	(Turkey) Galatasaray	14	5	9	968	1038	−70	19	Transfer to EuroCup Women	69–89	67–61	67–80	70–80	80–68	83–64		71–60
8	(Poland) VBW Arka Gdynia	14	2	12	935	1092	−157	16		70–87	71–86	71–67	64–67	65–78	74–87	76–75	

Source: FIBA
Legend: Blue = home team win; Red = away team win.

==== Results summary ====
Overall						Home					Away				
Pld	W	L	PF	PA	PD	W	L	PF	PA	PD	W	L	PF	PA	PD
14	5	9	968	1038	−70	4	3	507	502	+5	1	6	461	536	−75

Last updated: February 5, 2022.
Source: FIBA

==== Results by round ====
Round	1	2	3	4	5	6	7	8	9	10	11	12	13	14
Ground	H	A	H	H	A	H	A	A	H	A	A	H	A	H
Result	L	L	W	W	W	W	L	L	L	L	L	W	L	L
Position	7	7	6	4	2	1	5	6	6	6	5	6	5	7

Updated to match(es) played on February 5, 2022. Source: FIBA
A = Away; H = Home; W = Win; L = Loss

==== Matches ====
Win Loss

Note: All times are CET (UTC+1) as listed by EuroLeague.

6 October 2021 1	Galatasaray (Turkey)	69–89	(Turkey) Fenerbahçe Safiport	Yenibosna, Bahçelievler, Istanbul, Turkey
19:00	Scoring by quarter: 14–17, 24–26, 12–19, 19–27
Galatasaray TV	Pts: Krajišnik 23; Rebs: Krajišnik 22; Asts: Krajišnik 24; PIR: Krajišnik 29	Boxscore	Pts: Iagupova 29; Rebs: Williams 11; Asts: Iagupova 11; PIR: Iagupova 34	Arena: Şehit Mustafa Özel Spor Kompleksi; Referees: Viola Györgyi (Norway), Anastasios Kardaris (Greece), Cecília Tóth (Hungary)

13 October 2021 2	Dynamo Kursk (Russia)	78–76	(Turkey) Galatasaray	Kursk, Russia
18:00	Scoring by quarter: 20–22, 21–19, 19–17, 18–18
Galatasaray TV	Pts: Howard 17; Rebs: Howard 11; Asts: Prince, Barič 6 PIR: Howard 20	Boxscore	Pts: Krajišnik 26; Rebs: Krajišnik 12; Asts: Bilgiç 10; PIR: Krajišnik 29	Arena: Sport Concert Complex; Referees: Dumitru Stasiev (Moldova), Alakbar Hasanov (Azerbaijan), Ivana Radinovic (Montenegro)

20 October 2021 3	Galatasaray (Turkey)	71–60	(Poland) VBW Arka Gdynia	Yenibosna, Bahçelievler, Istanbul, Turkey
20:00	Scoring by quarter: 28–21, 7–16, 17–6, 19–17
Galatasaray TV	Pts: Williams 16; Rebs: Krajišnik 7 Asts: Bilgiç 6 PIR: Krajišnik 17	Boxscore	Pts: Gustafson 26; Rebs: Gustafson, Kunek 10; Asts: Kunek, Bernies 6 PIR: Gustafson 26	Arena: Şehit Mustafa Özel Spor Kompleksi; Referees: Elena Chernova (Russia), Sonia Teixeira (Portugal), Diana Lapanović (Slovenia)

27 October 2021 4	Galatasaray (Turkey)	83–64	(France) Basket Landes	Yenibosna, Bahçelievler, Istanbul, Turkey
20:00	Scoring by quarter: 21–8, 25–11, 17–25, 20–20
Galatasaray TV	Pts: Šteinberga 21; Rebs: Krajišnik, Šteinberga 8 Asts: Williams 8 PIR: Šteinberga 25	Boxscore	Pts: Tolo 18; Rebs: Magarity, Cunningham 7 Asts: Dumerc 9 PIR: Tolo 24	Arena: Şehit Mustafa Özel Spor Kompleksi; Referees: Igor Mitrovski (North Macedonia), Veronika Vávrová (Czech Republic), Emmouil Tsolakos (Greece)

3 November 2021 5	Spar Girona (Spain)	55–69	(Turkey) Galatasaray	Girona, Spain
20:15	Scoring by quarter: 17–27, 15–20, 16–10, 7–12
Galatasaray TV	Pts: Gardner 15; Rebs: Reisingerová 8 Asts: Palau 5 PIR: Gardner 15	Boxscore	Pts: three players 17; Rebs: three players 8 Asts: Gülcan 4 PIR: Williams, Bilgiç 15	Arena: Pavelló Girona-Fontajau; Referees: Zoran Mitrovski (North Macedonia), Amel Dahra (France), Alin Faur (Romania)

24 November 2021 6	Galatasaray (Turkey)	67–61	(Hungary) Sopron Basket	Yenibosna, Bahçelievler, Istanbul, Turkey
20:00	Scoring by quarter: 15–13, 27–21, 14–6, 11–21
TRT Spor Yıldız	Pts: Šteinberga 27; Rebs: Šteinberga 9 Asts: Williams 7 PIR: Šteinberga 31	Boxscore	Pts: Határ 19; Rebs: Határ 14; Asts: January 4 PIR: Határ 33	Arena: Şehit Mustafa Özel Spor Kompleksi; Referees: Viola Györgyi (Norway), Yasmina Alcaraz Moreno (Spain), Ivana Ivanovic (Serbia)

1 December 2021 7	Beretta Famila Schio (Italy)	76–73	(Turkey) Galatasaray	Schio, Italy
19:30	Scoring by quarter: 22–13, 17–23, 19–17, 18–20
Galatasaray TV	Pts: Laksa 11; Rebs: Keys 9 Asts: Dotto 5 PIR: Gruda 20	Boxscore	Pts: Davis 24; Rebs: Krajišnik 10; Asts: Bilgiç 8 PIR: Davis 29	Arena: Palazzetto Livio Romare; Referees: Valentin Oliot (France), Esperanza Mendoza Holgado (Spain), Veronika Vávrová (Czech Republic)

8 December 2021 8	Fenerbahçe Safiport (Turkey)	107–62	(Turkey) Galatasaray	Ataşehir, Istanbul, Turkey
19:00	Scoring by quarter: 27–11, 25–14, 30–18, 25–19
TRT Spor Yıldız	Pts: McBride 26; Rebs: Sabally 8 Asts: Iagupova 10; PIR: Sabally 28	Boxscore	Pts: Davis 15; Rebs: Davis 8 Asts: Krajišnik, Aydın 3 PIR: Başaran 16	Arena: Metro Energy Sports Hall; Referees: Jelena Tomic (Croatia), Amel Dahra (France), Maka Kupatadze (Georgia)

15 December 2021 9	Galatasaray (Turkey)	70–80	(Russia) Dynamo Kursk	Yenibosna, Bahçelievler, Istanbul, Turkey
20:00	Scoring by quarter: 23–14, 18–18, 15–25, 14–23
Galatasaray TV	Pts: Williams 25; Rebs: Krajišnik 12; Asts: Bilgiç 9 PIR: Krajišnik 26	Boxscore	Pts: Howard 25; Rebs: Howard 11; Asts: Ogunbowale 6 PIR: Ogunbowale 25	Arena: Şehit Mustafa Özel Spor Kompleksi; Referees: Alexandra Stan (Romania), Hrvoje Ćavar (Bosnia and Herzegovina), Zoran Mitrovski (North Macedonia)

21 December 2021 10	VBW Arka Gdynia (Poland)	76–75	(Turkey) Galatasaray	Gdynia, Poland
20:00	Scoring by quarter: 13–15, 22–20, 28–20, 13–20
	Pts: Gustafson 19; Rebs: Gustafson 9 Asts: Lundquist 8 PIR: Gustafson 24	Boxscore	Pts: Krajišnik 22; Rebs: Krajišnik 9 Asts: Bilgiç 10; PIR: Krajišnik 32	Arena: Gdynia Arena; Referees: Goran Sljivic (Austria), Ariadna Chueca Moreno (Spain), Andrada Csender (Romania)

30 January 2022 11	Basket Landes (France)	71–62	(Turkey) Galatasaray	Mont-de-Marsan, France
17:30	Scoring by quarter: 14–14, 24–15, 14–11, 19–22
Galatasaray TV	Pts: Fauthoux 15; Rebs: Magarity 11; Asts: Fauthoux 8 PIR: Magarity, Tolo 15	Boxscore	Pts: Krajišnik 21; Rebs: Krajišnik 11; Asts: Bilgiç 7 PIR: Krajišnik 18	Arena: Espace Francois Mitterrand; Referees: Esperanza Mendoza Holgado (Spain), Nemanja Ninkovic (Serbia), Suzana Vujicic (Montenegro)
Note: The game, originally scheduled for 12 January 2022, was postponed due to a COVID-19 outbreak within Galatasaray's squad.

19 January 2022 12	Galatasaray (Turkey)	80–68	(Spain) Spar Girona	Yenibosna, Bahçelievler, Istanbul, Turkey
20:00	Scoring by quarter: 24–15, 24–15, 18–21, 14–17
Galatasaray TV	Pts: Bilgiç 18; Rebs: Krajišnik 10; Asts: Bilgiç 10; PIR: Bilgiç 34	Boxscore	Pts: Burke 22; Rebs: Gardner 9 Asts: Palau 6 PIR: Burke 21	Arena: Şehit Mustafa Özel Spor Kompleksi; Referees: Jelena Tomic (Croatia), Amel Dahra (France), Amalia Marchis (Romania)

26 January 2022 13	Sopron Basket (Hungary)	73–44	(Turkey) Galatasaray	Sopron, Hungary
23:00	Scoring by quarter: 16–14, 28–12, 11–16, 18–2
Galatasaray TV	Pts: Határ 16; Rebs: four players 8 Asts: Williams 7 PIR: Határ 22	Boxscore	Pts: Davis 13; Rebs: Krajišnik 7 Asts: Bilgiç 6 PIR: Bilgiç 10	Arena: Novomatic Arèna Sopron; Referees: Zdenko Tomasovic (Slovakia), Ariadna Chueca Moreno (Spain), Jan Baloun (Czech Republic)

2 February 2022 14	Galatasaray (Turkey)	67–80	(Italy) Beretta Famila Schio	Yenibosna, Bahçelievler, Istanbul, Turkey
20:00	Scoring by quarter: 14–21, 16–22, 24–21, 13–16
Galatasaray TV	Pts: Plum 20; Rebs: Başaran 8 Asts: Bilgiç 10; PIR: Bilgiç 20	Boxscore	Pts: Gruda 16; Rebs: Keys 9 Asts: DeShields 6 PIR: Keys 20	Arena: Şehit Mustafa Özel Spor Kompleksi; Referees: Sinisa Prpa (Serbia), Haris Bijedic (Bosnia and Herzegovina), Ivana Radinovic (Montenegro)

=== EuroCup Women ===
==== Quarterfinals ====
Win Loss

Note: All times are CET (UTC+1) as listed by EuroCup.

10 March 2022 1	KSC Szekszárd (Hungary)	60–88	(Turkey) Galatasaray	Szekszárd, Hungary
18:00 (20:00 TRT)	Scoring by quarter: 17–23, 10–22, 19–26, 14–17
	Pts: Krnjić 11; Rebs: four players 4 Asts: Studer 5 PIR: Krnjić 11	Boxscore	Pts: Plum 34; Rebs: Krajišnik 15; Asts: Plum 6 PIR: Plum 37	Arena: Szekszard Varosi Sportcsarnok; Referees: Mila Cavara (Bosnia and Herzegovina), Peter Zenis (Slovakia), Milosav Kaludjerovic (Montenegro)

16 March 2022 2	Galatasaray (Turkey)	76–69	(Hungary) KSC Szekszárd	Yenibosna, Bahçelievler, Istanbul, Turkey
20:00	Scoring by quarter: 19–21, 26–12, 17–20, 14–16
TRT Spor Yıldız, TRT Spor 2	Pts: Plum 28; Rebs: three players 9 Asts: Plum, Aydın 5 PIR: Plum 34	Boxscore	Pts: Goree 18; Rebs: Studer 8 Asts: Morgan 5 PIR: Milić 17	Arena: Şehit Mustafa Özel Spor Kompleksi; Referees: Alberto Sánchez Sixto (Spain), Veronika Vávrová (Czech Republic), Hrvoje Čavar (Bosnia and Herzegovina)

==== EuroCup Women Final Four ====
===== Semifinals =====
Win Loss

Note: All times are CET (UTC+1) as listed by EuroCup.

5 April 2022 SF	Tango Bourges Basket (France)	69–67	(Turkey) Galatasaray	Bourges, France
20:00 (21:00 TRT)	Scoring by quarter: 17–18, 15–20, 17–18, 20–11
Galatasaray TV, TRT Spor	Pts: Duchet 19; Rebs: Rupert 8 Asts: Michel, Mann 3 PIR: Rupert 17	Boxscore	Pts: Plum 21; Rebs: Krajišnik 12; Asts: Evans 6 PIR: Evans, Krajišnik 18	Arena: Palais des Sports du Prado; Referees: Martin Vulic (Croatia), Jelena Smiljanic (Serbia), Milosav Kaludjerovic (Montenegro)

===== Third place game =====
Win Loss

Note: All times are CET (UTC+1) as listed by EuroCup.

7 April 2022	Galatasaray (Turkey)	75–67	(Turkey) ÇBK Mersin Yenişehir Belediyesi	Bourges, France
17:00 (18:00 TRT)	Scoring by quarter: 13–13, 29–21, 17–8, 16–25
Galatasaray TV, TRT Spor	Pts: Davis 17; Rebs: Krajišnik 12; Asts: Plum 7 PIR: Plum 20	Boxscore	Pts: Bonner 22; Rebs: Bonner 13; Asts: five players 2 PIR: Bonner 24	Arena: Palais des Sports du Prado; Referees: Martin Vulic (Croatia), Milosav Kaludjerovic (Montenegro), Ariadna Chueca Moreno (Spain)

=== Turkish Women's Basketball Cup ===
==== Quarterfinals ====
Win Loss

22 March 2022 QF	Fenerbahçe Safiport	74–68	Galatasaray	Mersin, Turkey
19:30 TRT (UTC +3)	Scoring by quarter: 22–24, 18–19, 17–10, 17–15
Tivibu Spor	Pts: Iagupova 18; Rebs: Canıtez 10; Asts: Iagupova 8 PIR: Iagupova 25	Report	Pts: Plum 24; Rebs: Krajišnik 11; Asts: Plum 7 PIR: Plum 28	Arena: Servet Tazegül Arena; Referees: Yener Yılmaz, Göksun Öz, Çağlar Özkan
