= List of 2018–19 KBSL season transactions =

This is a list of transactions that have taken place during the off-season and the 2018–19 Turkish Women's Basketball League.

== Front office movements ==
=== Head coach changes ===
Off-season

Departure date	Team	Outgoing head coach	Reason for departure	Hire date	Incoming head coach	Last coaching position	Ref.
	TBA						

== Player movement ==
=== Free agency ===
Player	Date signed	New team	Former team	Ref
(Spain) Astou Ndour	June 6	Çukurova	Ragusa (ITA)	
(United States) Moriah Jefferson	June 25	Galatasaray		
(Ukraine) Alina Iagupova	June 29	Çukurova		
(Ukraine) Liudmyla Naumenko	June 29	Çukurova		
(Italy) Giorgia Sottana	June 30	Fenerbahçe		
(Lithuania) Gintarė Petronytė	July 2	Mersin BŞB	Galatasaray	
(Italy) Cecilia Zandalasini	July 4	Fenerbahçe	PF Schio (ITA)	
(United States) Bria Hartley	July 5	Fenerbahçe	Mersin BŞB	
(United States) Kiah Stokes	July 6	Fenerbahçe	Beşiktaş	
(United States) Kelsey Plum	July 7	Fenerbahçe		
(Slovakia) Marie Růžičková	July 9	OGM Ormanspor	Venezia (ITA)	
(United States) Kahleah Copper	July 9	OGM Ormanspor	Basket 90 Gdynia (POL)	
(Turkey) Asena Yalçın	July 10	Mersin BŞB		
(Turkey) Birsel Vardarlı	July 11	Fenerbahçe		
(Turkey) Cansu Köksal	July 12	Hatay BŞB	Yakın Doğu Üniversitesi	
(Turkey) Melis Talay	July 16	Mersin BŞB	Çukurova	
(Belarus) Katsiaryna Snytsina	July 16	Hatay BŞB		
(Australia) Nicole Romeo	July 19	Canik	Uni Girona CB (ESP)	
(Serbia) Saša Čađo	July 20	Mersin BŞB		
(Turkey) Ilknur Yildizhan	July 20	Abdullah Gül Üniversitesi		
(Belgium) Hind Ben Abdelkader	July 22	Hatay BŞB		
(United States) Tiffany Mitchell	July 30	Mersin BŞB	Nadezhda Orenburg (RUS)	
(Turkey) Işıl Alben	August 1	Galatasaray		
(Turkey) Olcay Çakır Turgut	August 1	Botaş	Yakın Doğu Üniversitesi	
(Turkey) Bahar Çağlar	August 1	Beşiktaş	Yakın Doğu Üniversitesi	
(Lithuania) Monika Grigalauskytė	August 1	Galatasaray	Energa Toruń (POL)	
(United States) Jewell Loyd	August 2	Botaş	Guri KDB Life Winnus (KOR)	
(Sweden) Farhiya Abdi	August 2	Galatasaray	Wisła Kraków (POL)	
(Romania) Claudia Pop	August 2	Botaş	İstanbul Üniversitesi	
(Hungary) Tijana Krivačević	August 2	Botaş	UNI Győr (HUN)	
(United States) Elizabeth Williams	August 2	Botaş	Liaoning Flying Eagles (CHN)	
(Jamaica) Aneika Henry	August 4	OGM Ormanspor	Heilongjiang Shenda (CHN)	
(United States) Rebekah Gardner	August 4	OGM Ormanspor	İstanbul Üniversitesi	
(United States) Jacinta Monroe	August 5	Canik	Enisey Krasnoyarsk (RUS)	
(Lithuania) Kristina Alminaitė	August 5	Canik	Uni Girona CB (ESP)	
(Turkey) Dilara Tongar	August 6	Canik	Botaş	
(Romania) Ashley Walker	August 6	Mersin BŞB	Venezia (ITA)	
(Turkey) Nilay Kartaltepe	August 7	OGM Ormanspor	Abdullah Gül Üniversitesi	
(Turkey) Özge Kavurmacıoğlu	August 7	OGM Ormanspor	Galatasaray	
(Turkey) Melisa Korkmaz	August 8	Mersin BŞB	Fenerbahçe	
(Turkey) Gülşah Gümüşay	August 9	Mersin BŞB		
(Turkey) Dila Aşkin	August 9	OGM Ormanspor	Abdullah Gül Üniversitesi	
(Turkey) Damla Gezgin	August 9	OGM Ormanspor		
(Turkey) Miray Sahin	August 11	OGM Ormanspor	İstanbul Üniversitesi	
(Turkey) Melek Yusufoğlu	August 14	İzmit BŞB		
(Turkey) Gizem Yavuz	August 14	İzmit BŞB	Canik	
(United States) Kelsey Mitchell	August 17	Beşiktaş	Ohio State Buckeyes (USA)	
(Turkey) Melisa Can	August 18	Canik	OGM Ormanspor	
(Turkey) Deniz Çolakoğlu	August 18	Canik	Mersin BŞB	
(Turkey) Emel Türkyılmaz	August 19	İzmit BŞB	Urla BŞB	
(Turkey) Yeliz Dogan	August 19	Hatay BŞB	Urla BŞB	
(Turkey) Merve Aydın	August 19	Hatay BŞB		
(Nigeria) Evelyn Akhator	August 21	Beşiktaş	Dynamo Novosibirsk (RUS)	
(Turkey) Melike Bakırcıoğlu	August 22	İzmit BŞB	Adana ASKI Mersin	
(Turkey) Hülya Coklar	August 24	Hatay BŞB		
(Turkey) Gizem Başaran	August 24	Hatay BŞB	Galatasaray	
(Turkey) Ayşegül Günay	August 24	Hatay BŞB	Galatasaray	
(United States) Courtney Paris	August 24	Hatay BŞB		
(United States) Glory Johnson	August 24	Hatay BŞB	Guangdong Dolphins (CHN)	
(Croatia) Iva Slonjšak	August 27	Çukurova	ŽKK Celje (SLO)	
(United States) Sequoia Holmes	August 27	Canik	Bnei Yehuda Tel Aviv (ISR)	
(Turkey) Ceyda Sinan	August 27	İzmit BŞB	Adana ASKI Mersin	
(Russia) Marina Bas	August 27	İzmit BŞB	Adana ASKI Mersin	
(United States) Victoria Macaulay	August 28	Galatasaray	Olympiacos (GRE)	\
(Turkey) Nazlı Gökdemir	August 28	Galatasaray	Adana ASKI Mersin	
(Ukraine) Viktoria Mircheva	August 29	Beşiktaş	Hatay BŞB	
(Turkey) İrem Naz Topuz	August 31	Galatasaray		
(Turkey) Esra Erden Atacan	September 1	Beşiktaş		
(Turkey) Sinem Ataş	September 6	Galatasaray	Çukurova	

=== Going overseas ===
Player	Date signed	New team	Former team	Ref
(Australia) Leilani Mitchell	March 22	Canberra Capitals (AUS)	Hatay BŞB	
(Australia) Marianna Tolo	April 19	Canberra Capitals (AUS)	Abdullah Gül Üniversitesi	
(United States) Erica Wheeler	May 24	Nadezhda Orenburg (RUS)	Beşiktaş	
(Montenegro) Jelena Dubljević	June 13	Shanghai Baoshan Dahua (CHN)	Galatasaray	
(Hungary) Courtney Vandersloot	August 23	UMMC Ekaterinburg (RUS)	Yakın Doğu Üniversitesi	
(United States) Kayla McBride	September 1	UMMC Ekaterinburg (RUS)	Yakın Doğu Üniversitesi	
(Turkey) Devran Bostancı	September 6	CAB Madeira (POR)	Hatay BŞB	

== See also ==
- 2018-19 Turkish Women's Basketball League season
- List of 2018-19 Turkish Women's Basketball League rosters
