= Aktan =

Aktan is a given name and a surname. Notable people with the name include:

== Given name ==
- Aktan Abdykalykov (born 1957), Kyrgyzstani screenwriter

== Surname ==
- A. Emin Aktan, American engineer
- Coşkun Can Aktan (born 1963), Turkish economist
- Gündüz Aktan (1941–2008), Turkish diplomat and politician
- Hamza Aktan (born 1983), Kurdish journalist and writer
- Ümit Aktan (1949–2025), Turkish sports journalist
