= October 2016 Istanbul bombing =

Terrorist attack happened at Istanbul, Turkey

- Part of the Kurdish–Turkish conflict
- Location: 40.99563°N 28.83149°E; Yenibosna, Bahçelievler, Istanbul, Turkey
- Date: 6 October 2016; 15:50 (UTC+3)
- Attack type: Car bomb (motorcycle used)
- Deaths: 0
- Injuries: 10 civilians (1 in critical condition)
- Perpetrator: PKK
- Assailants: Felek Gün, Ekrem Gün and co-conspirators

On 6 October 2016, at around 15:50 (UTC+3), a bomb attached to a motorcycle blasted in a terrorist attack in Yenibosna neighborhood of Bahçelievler district, Istanbul, Turkey. The bomb targeted a police office, however, either on purpose or not, the bomb was exploded before getting closer to the police station and eventually injured 10 civilians in the area, putting 1 in critical condition.

The neighborhood is one of the closest ones to the Atatürk Airport and Istanbul Inner Beltway and is a neighborhood where Bosniak residents of the city mainly live.

The attack was perpetrated by the outlawed Kurdistan Workers' Party (PKK). The assailant, Felek Gün and co-conspirators Ekrem Gün and Serdar Gün along with 3 more suspects involved in the incident were taken into custody by the police. Assailant had a terrorism record with the outlawed group in both Iraq and Syria, incursing into the Turkish town of Cizre from area controlled by YPG in Syria during the recent Cizre clashes, reports highlighted. He was caught in Aksaray Province, on his way to a PKK camp in Syria, with another two of the co-conspirators one day after the attack.

Officials and experts highlighted that there were 2 schools close to the vicinity of the attack and in case the attack was conducted 10–20 minutes later, when the daily school endtime arrives, there would be a disaster resulting in many school children, going out from their schools to homes or schoolbuses, losing their lives cause of the terrorist attack.

== See also ==
- June 2016 Istanbul bombing
