= TGRT =

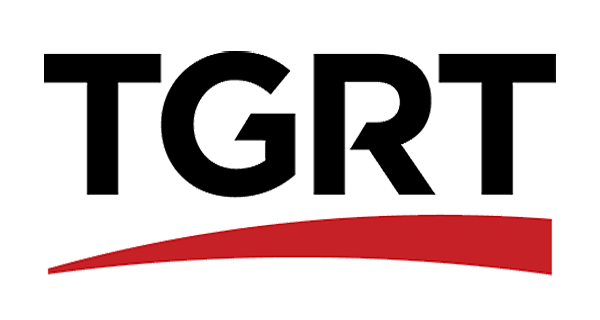
- Country: Turkey
- Headquarters: 29 Ekim Avenue, Yenibosna, Bahçelievler, Istanbul, Turkey

Programming
- Language: Turkish
- Picture format: 576i (16:9 SDTV); 1080i (16:9 HDTV)

Ownership
- Owner: İhlas Holding
- Sister channels: TGRT Haber; TGRT Belgesel; TGRT EU

History
- Launched: 22 April 1993; 33 years ago (initial opening) 14 August 2026; 3 months ago (second opening)
- Replaced: TGRT EU
- Closed: 24 February 2007; 19 years ago (initial closure)
- Replaced by: FOX

Links
- Website: www.tgrt.com.tr

TGRT (full name: Türkiye Gazetesi Radyo Televizyonu — Turkey Newspaper Radio and Television) was launched by İhlas Holding on April 22, 1993, in Cağaloğlu, during the early years of private television broadcasting in Türkiye. It holds the distinction of being the first national television channel in Türkiye to be sold to foreign capital. Following the sale of its broadcasting rights to the American company News Corporation on July 25, 2006—after which the channel continued its operations under the name "NOW"—most of TGRT’s terrestrial broadcasting frequencies and rights were transferred. While the TGRT brand remains in use as a corporate entity, the organization continues to broadcast through its sister channels, TGRT Haber and TGRT Belgesel. On August 14, 2026, the channel resumed broadcasting, replacing "TGRT EU" and dropping the "EU" suffix from its logo to return simply as "TGRT."

== History ==
TGRT, one of Türkiye's first private television channels, was founded by Enver Ören on April 22, 1993, in the Cağaloğlu/Cibali neighborhood of Fatih, Istanbul. Established during the same period as other early private channels—such as Star TV, Teleon, Show TV, Kanal 6, HBB, Samanyolu TV, Flash TV, and Mesaj TV—TGRT initially adopted a conservative and nationalist editorial stance. In its early years, the channel distinguished itself through religious-themed films, talk shows, programs detailing the lives of Islamic saints and scholars, *mukabele* (Quran recitation sessions), documentaries, and family-oriented series. Furthermore, by aligning its broadcasting policy with the İhlas News Agency (İhlas Haber Ajansı)—also founded by the İhlas Group and one of Türkiye's first private news agencies—TGRT delivered impactful news bulletins to its audience. During this same period, TGRT FM, one of Türkiye's first private radio stations, also began its broadcasts alongside the television channel.

Starting in 1998, TGRT underwent a complete shift in its programming strategy, pivoting toward entertainment, music, celebrity news, and television series. This transition quickly propelled it to become one of the most-watched channels in Türkiye. Numerous prominent figures—including Seda Sayan, Sibel Can, Gülben Ergen, Seren Serengil, Hülya Avşar, Ebru Gündeş, Pınar Altuğ, Muazzez Ersoy, Sibel Turnagöl, Sinan Özen, Cüneyt Arkın, Kadir İnanır, Kenan Doğulu, Kenan Kalav, Mehmet Ali Erbil, Alişan, Özcan Deniz, Mahsun Kırmızıgül, Erkan Petekkaya, and Emrah—began appearing in series and entertainment programs on the channel. During those years, the channel's main news bulletin was anchored by Jülide Ateş. In 1998, TGRT changed its logo and shifted its position from the top-right corner to the bottom-right corner of the screen.

The transformation process that began in 1998 continued into the early 2000s, during which time TGRT persisted in airing lifestyle and women-oriented shows, morning programs, entertainment/tabloid news, and domestic television series. Notably, the long-running series *Çocuklar Duymasın*—one of Türkiye’s most-watched shows, which aired on various channels between 2002 and 2019—originally premiered on TGRT. After its first 13 episodes aired there, the series moved to the channel ATV.

TGRT was also affected by the crisis surrounding İhlas Finans—a financial institution under the umbrella of İhlas Holding—which fell into an economic crisis in 2001; consequently, the channel began to gradually lose its former popularity. Although it had once hosted programs featuring some of Türkiye’s most famous personalities, the channel continued its operations, albeit with a diminished profile. On February 10, 2001, the Banking Regulation and Supervision Agency (BRSA) issued decision No. 171, suspending the operating license of İhlas Finans and initiating its liquidation process. From that point on, TGRT drifted further away from its previous level of popularity.

Beginning in 2004, new channels under the TGRT brand—TGRT Haber, TGRT Pazarlama, and TGRT EU—began their broadcasts. In 2010, TGRT Pazarlama was rebranded as TGRT Belgesel (Documentary), and in 2026, TGRT EU was transformed into TGRT. Facing an economic crisis and struggling to settle debts stemming from the İhlas Finans affair, the group sold its main national channel, TGRT, to the American company News Corporation in 2006. In July 2006, all shares of the channel were sold to News Corporation and Ahmet Ertegün, with the stipulation that the rights to the TGRT brand name would remain with the İhlas Group. Subsequently, TGRT EU—which broadcast to Turks living in Europe—was also included in the sale, leading to the launch of FOX Türk.

The sale was limited to TGRT (with TGRT EU later being added to the deal), while the TGRT brand itself remained with the İhlas Group. During the channel's transition, its logo was reduced in size on November 15, 2006, and on January 26, 2007, it lost its color, becoming transparent. On the evening of February 24, 2007, a special program marked the rebranding of TGRT to FOX (now known as NOW). The event also featured a concert by Kenan Doğulu. TGRT continues its broadcasting operations today under its current name, NOW. Meanwhile, entities such as TGRT Haber, TGRT Pazarlama, and TGRT FM remain under the umbrella of İhlas Holding.

Following the passing of Enver Ören, İhlas Holding—now under the leadership of Mücahit Ören—continues to operate in the media sector through TGRT, TGRT Belgesel, TGRT FM, TGRT Haber, and the newspaper *Türkiye*.

On March 26, 2025, journalist Cem Küçük announced that a license for an entertainment channel under the TGRT brand had been acquired and that a formal application had been submitted to the Public Disclosure Platform (KAP). On the same day, Ercan Seki, Editor-in-Chief of TGRT Haber, announced the development via his X (social media) account by posting an image featuring the TGRT logo, accompanied by the caption, "What is coming is on its way."

The channel resumed operations using the frequency previously held by TGRT EU—which had ceased broadcasting on August 15, 2026—and was rebranded as "TGRT" following the removal of the "EU" suffix from its logo. It now broadcasts in a 24/7 simulcast with TGRT Haber.
