= Gizem =

- Gender: Female

Origin
- Language: Turkish
- Meaning: "Mystery", "Enigma"

Gizem is a common feminine Turkish given name. In Turkish, "Gizem" means "Mystery", and/or "Enigma". Pronunciation is "GI-ZEM," with a hard "g" (as in "gift") and emphasis on the second syllable.

== People ==
- Gizem Başaran (born 1992), Turkish basketballer
- Gizem Bozkurt (born 1993), Turkish swimmer
- Gizem Çam (born 1991), Turkish swimmer
- Gizem Elmaağaçlı (born 1997), Turkish archer
- Gizem Erdogan (born 1987), Swedish actress
- Gizem Giraygil (born 1986), Turkish volleyball player
- Gizem Girişmen (born 1981), Turkish archer
- Gizem Gönültaş (born 1993), Turkish footballer
- Gizem Güreşen (born 1987), Turkish volleyball player
- Gizem Güvenç (born 2002), Turkish swimmer
- Gizem Karaca (born 1992), Turkish actress
- Gizem Karaali, American mathematician
- Gizem Memiç (born 1990), Turkish model and Miss Turkey 2010
- Gizem Özer (born 2001), Turkish boxer
- Gizem Özkan (born 2002), Turkish archer
- Gizem Saka (born 1978), Turkish artist and economist
- Gizem Sofuoğlu, Turkish karateka
- Gizem Yavuz (born 1988), Turkish basketballer

== Middle name ==
- Hatice Gizem Örge (born 1993), Turkish volleyball player
