= İhlas Holding =

Turkish conglomerate

İhlas Holding A.Ş.
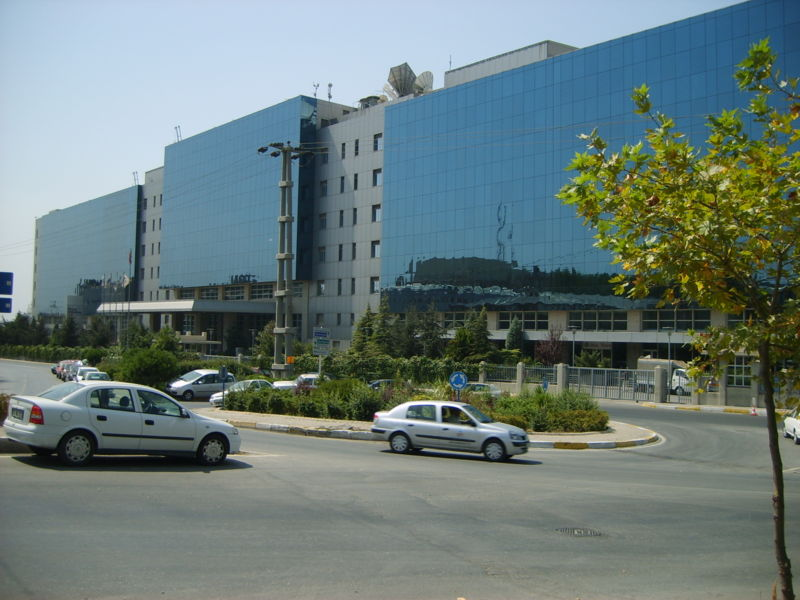
- İhlas Holding Its Building located in Yenibosna
- Type: Anonim Şirket
- Traded as: BİST: IHLAS
- Industry: Conglomerate
- Founded: 1980; 46 years ago
- Founder: Enver Ören
- Headquarters: Yenibosna, Bahçelievler, Istanbul, Turkey
- Area served: Worldwide
- Key people: Ahmet Mücahid Ören (Chairman of the Board)
- Products: Finance, Energy, Cement, Retail, Insurance, Industry, Building, E-Commerce, Commercial Services, Selling All Kinds of Goods and Services
- Revenue: ▲ ₺7.56 billion (2023)
- Operating income: ▼ ₺1.10 billion (2023)
- Net income: ▼ ₺78.0 million (2023)
- Total assets: ▲ ₺16.9 billion (2023)
- Total equity: ▲ ₺9.39 billion (2023)
- Number of employees: 2,517
- Subsidiaries: 31
- Website: ihlas.com.tr/en/

İhlas Holding A.Ş. is a Turkish conglomerate founded by Enver Ören. In addition to its media assets, which include the Türkiye newspaper TGRT ,TGRT FM and TGRT News TV, TGRT Documentary group operates in construction through İhlas Construction Group; electrical and electronic appliances through İhlas Home Appliances Inc.; trade through İhlas Marketing; energy and mining through İhlas Mining; and health and education through Türkiye Hospital and İhlas College. The company has been listed on the Istanbul Stock Exchange since 1994.

The company's history began with the foundation of the Türkiye newspaper in 1970, but the holding itself was not created until 1993.

== Stock market ==
İhlas has five listings on the Istanbul Stock Exchange (BIST):

- İhlas Holding (IHLAS): Main holding
- İhlas Ev Aletleri İmalat Sanayi ve Ticaret (IHEVA): Manufacturing
- İhlas Gazetecilik (IHGZT): Türkiye newspaper, floated 2010 (33% of shares)
- İhlas Madencilik (IHMAD): Mining
- İhlas Yayın Holding (IHYAY): Media

== Media ==
- TGRT
- TGRT News
- TGRT FM
- TGRT Documentary
- TGRT EU
- Türkiye
- İhlas News Agency
- İhlas Magazine Group
- İhlas Media Planning and Purchasing Services Inc.
- Digital Assets Visual Media and Internet
- Ihlasnet Co.
