= Bahçelievler Stadium =

Stadium in Istanbul, Turkey

Coordinates: 40°59′47.64″N 28°49′55.63″E

Bahçelievler Stadium (Turkish: Bahçelievler Stadyumu) is a stadium in the Yenibosna district of Bahçelievler, Istanbul, Turkey. It is the home stadium of Yenibosna Spor Kulübü and İstanbulspor A.Ş. The stadium's only stand (the north stand) is a covered all-seater which holds a total capacity of 4,100 people.
