= Yenibosna S.K. =

- Full name: Yenibosna Sports Club
- Nickname: Bosna
- Founded: 1961
- Ground: Bahçelievler Stadium, Istanbul, Turkey
- Capacity: 4,100
- Chairman: (Turkey) Hâşim Taşkıran
- Manager: (Turkey) Turan saraç
- League: Istanbul Amateur Super League
- 2008–09: Istanbul Amateur Super League, 7th
Home colours	Away colours

Yenibosna Sports Club, or Yenibosna Spor Kulübü (YBSK), is the multi-sports club affiliated with the borough of Yenibosna in Bahçelievler, Istanbul. It was founded as Kuleli Gençlik Spor Kulübü (Kuleli Youth and Sports Club). In 1978, with the efforts of the club's president of the time, Bayram Alaçatı, the club was accepted to the Istanbul Second Amateur League. In 1979–80 season, the club's name changed to its current name. Although the football is the main branch of the club, there are also branches of athletics and kick-boxing, wrestling, judo, basketball, and volleyball are in the initializing period. The football club plays its games at Bahçelievler Stadium which is an all-seater stadium that can hold 4,100 spectators. The one and only notable player of the club is former Beşiktaş J.K. and Turkey national football team member Ziya Doğan. The club has a strong following, not only in the borough of Yenibosna but also throughout the Bahçelievler district of Istanbul. Their hooligan firm is called Genç Yenibosnalılar (Young Yenibosnalites).
