= Şehit Mustafa Özel Spor Kompleksi =

Multi-purpose sports venue in Turkey

Martyr Mustafa Özel Sports Complex Şehit Mustafa Özel Spor Kompleksi
- Interactive map of Martyr Mustafa Özel Sports Complex; Şehit Mustafa Özel Spor Kompleksi
- Location: Yenibosna, Bahçelievler, Istanbul, Turkey
- Coordinates: 40.9969029°N 28.8332218°E
- Owner: Istanbul Metropolitan Municipality
- Capacity: 2,100

Construction
- Opened: 2015; 11 years ago

Tenant
- Galatasaray (2021–present)

Martyr Mustafa Özel Sports Complex (Turkish: Şehit Mustafa Özel Spor Kompleksi) is an indoor multi-purpose sport venue that is located in the Yenibosna, Bahçelievler, Istanbul, Turkey. The hall, with a capacity for 2,100 spectators, was built in 2015.

== History ==
In the statement made on 27 September 2021, Galatasaray Women's Basketball Team announced that they will play their games in the Women's Basketball Super League and EuroLeague Women in this hall in the 2021–22 season.
