= TGRT Haber =

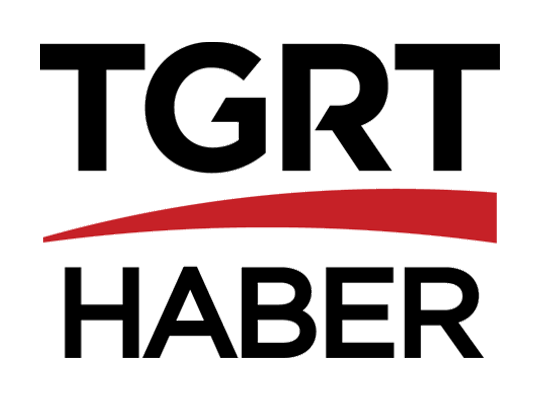
- Country: Turkey
- Broadcast area: 29 October Avenue, Yenibosna, Bahçelievler, Istanbul, Turkey
- Affiliates: TGRT FM

Programming
- Language: Turkish
- Picture format: 576i (16:9 SDTV); 1080i (16:9 HDTV)

Ownership
- Owner: İhlas Holding

History
- Launched: 29 November 2004; 21 years ago

Links
- Website: www.tgrthaber.com.tr

TGRT Haber is a pro-government nationwide TV channel in Turkey. It was founded on October 29, 2004, by İhlas Holding. It has a sister channel named TGRT Haber EU, which closed in circa 2011.
