= Ümit Aktan =

Turkish sportscaster, author and presenter (1949–2025)

- Born: Ümit Yusuf Aktan; 21 January 1949; Nazilli, Aydın, Turkey
- Died: 7 August 2025 (aged 76); Bodrum, Muğla, Turkey
- Resting place: Ortakent Cemetery
- Education: Galatasaray High School, Marmara University
- Occupations: Television presenter; radio presenter; sports commentator; sports journalist; writer
- Spouses: Nigar Akanay (m. 1974); Ayşe Onarır (m. 1978); Neslihan Aktan; Selin Dilmen (m. 1991–1999); Sema Küçükşahin (m. 2007–2025)
- Children: 2

Ümit Yusuf Aktan (21 January 1949 – 7 August 2025) was a Turkish sportscaster, journalist, author and presenter.

He began his broadcasting career at the Turkish Radio and Television Corporation (TRT) in the early 1970s and became known for his commentary on Turkish national football team matches, Süper Lig fixtures and European club competitions. Throughout his career, he worked for several television channels, including TGRT, ATV and Star TV, and contributed sports columns to Turkish newspapers.

== Personal life and death ==
Ümit Yusuf Aktan was born to Mualla Karabay as the only child of his family in Nazilli, Aydın on 21 January 1949. He studied at Galatasaray High School for nine years as a boarding student. After completing the secondary education, he intended to study Political Science. However, he enrolled in the Faculty of Journalism at the newly founded Marmara University in Istanbul due to his father's insistence.

In 1974, Aktan married Nigar Akanay, a ballet dancer at the State Ballet of Istanbul. His second marriage, in 1978, to Ayşe Onarır, a news and programme presenter at the Turkish Radio and Television Corporation (TRT), lasted only six months. Little is known about his next marriage, to Neslihan Aktan, other than the fact that a son, Enkidu, was born to them in 1981 and named Enkidu, after a legendary figure in ancient Mesopotamian mythology. On 3 November 1991, Aktan married Selin Dilmen (born 1969), a stage, television and cinema actress, who had been briefly married before in 1989. From this marriage, they had a daughter, Dilara, born in 1995. The couple divorced in 1999. In 2007, in a simple but surprise wedding ceremony in Bodrum, Muğla Province, he married for the last time, to Sema Küçükşahin (born 1959), with whom he had a long-time relationship.

He spent his summer holidays at his summer residence in the Turgutreis neighborhood of Bodrum, southwestern Turkey.

Aktan died on 7 August 2025, at the age of 76, in the hospital, where he was treated for heart disease. He was buried at Ortakent Cemetery following the religious service in Kerem Aydınlar Mosque in Ortakent village of Bodrum, attended by former sportspeople and journalists. He was survived by his spouse Sema.

== Career ==
Aktan started playing football during his high school years. He played in the school team four years, and served as the team captain. Later, he was admitted to the Galatasaray Youth team, where he played two years as captain. However, a serious injury ended his football career.

In 1972, Aktan passed the exams to enter the state-owned Turkish Radio and Television Corporation (TRT), and started as a sports journalist. On 17 February 1973, he announced for the first time a top-level football league match. In 1975, he became a member of the "Türkiye Spor Yazarları Derneği" (Turkish Sports Writers Association) while he was working at the newspaper Son Havadis. Later, he served as the manager of the sports department at the daily Yeni Asır. On 22 April 1993, he took part at the establishment of the TGRT (Türkiye Gazetesi Radyo Televizyonu), and announced football league matches there. He later presented sports and game shows on TGRT. In 1997, he was appointed TGRT's sports director. After transferring to TV channel Kanal 6, he began presenting the programme "Haydi Maça" ("Let's Go To The Match"). After transferring from Kanal 6 to the TV channel ATV, he continued with his programme "Haydi Maça" until 2009. He served as a commentator on the programme "Futbol Gecesi" ("Football Night") broadcast on TGRT News. He also wrote columns for the newspapers Tercüman, Yeni Şafak, and Türkiye.

During his broadcasting career, Aktan commentated on matches involving the Turkey national football team, Süper Lig clubs and Turkish teams competing in European football competitions. In addition to live match commentary, he hosted and moderated sports programmes on television and radio.

From 2007 to 2014, Aktan worked as a commentator on Futbol Gecesi, a sports programme broadcast on TGRT Haber. He later provided match commentary for Ziraat Turkish Cup fixtures broadcast by A Spor.

In addition to his television career, Aktan wrote sports columns for Son Havadis, Yeni Asır, Yeni Şafak and Türkiye. He was a member of the Journalists Association of Turkey (TGC) and held a permanent press card. He was also recognized with professional journalism awards during his career.
