= Yenibosna Merkez =

Neighbourhood in Bahçelievler, Istanbul, Turkey

Yenibosna
- Neighbourhood

- Location within Turkey Location within Istanbul
- Coordinates: 40°59′51″N 28°51′02″E
- Country: Turkey
- Province: Istanbul
- District: Bahçelievler

Government
  - Muhtar: Ali Osman Kayacan
- Population (2022): 34,130 34,197
- Time zone: UTC+3 (TRT)

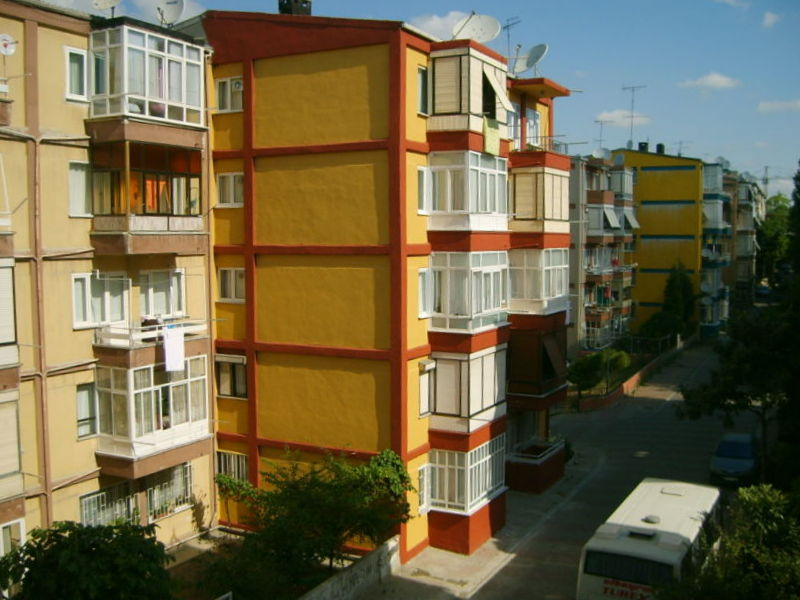
Apartments in Yenibosna

Yenibosna Merkez (Yenibosna Merkez meaning Yenibosna's Center in Turkish language) is a neighbourhood in the municipality and district of Bahçelievler, western Istanbul Province, Turkey. Its population is 37,130 (2022).

The neighbourhood is in the west of Bahçelievler, bordering with the neighbor district Küçükçekmece.

The majority of the residents of Yenibosna borough are Bosniaks.

== Sports ==
The Sports club affiliated with the borough is Yenibosna Spor Kulübü.
