= Türkiye (newspaper) =

Turkish newspaper

- Type: Daily newspaper
- Owner: İhlas Holding (66%)
- Founded: 22 April 1970; 56 years ago
- Political alignment: Conservatism
- Language: Turkish
- Headquarters: Yenibosna
- City: Istanbul
- Country: Turkey
- Circulation: 180,000 (May 2013)
- Website: www.turkiyegazetesi.com.tr

Türkiye (English: Turkey) is a Turkish newspaper owned by İhlas Group. The paper was founded by Enver Ören in 1970 as Hakikat, and was renamed Türkiye in 1972. It sold 119,000 copies in 1985, and 300,000 copies in 1989. Nevzat Yalçıntaş is among the former editors-in-chief of the paper. Notable contributors include Ayhan Songar who published articles from 1989 to 1997 and Rahîm Er. In the late 1990s, the paper was close to the conservative think tank Intellectuals' Hearth.

== Ownership ==
Türkiye's parent company, İhlas Gazetecilik, was floated on the Istanbul Stock Exchange in 2010 (33% of shares, with the remainder owned by İhlas Holding).
