= Türkyılmaz =

Türkyılmaz is a Turkish name and may refer to:

- Emel Türkyılmaz, Turkish basketball player
- İzzet Türkyılmaz, Turkish basketball player
- Kubilay Türkyilmaz, Swiss footballer of Turkish descent
