= Siyavuşpaşa =

Neighborhood in Bahçelievler district, Istanbul, Turkey

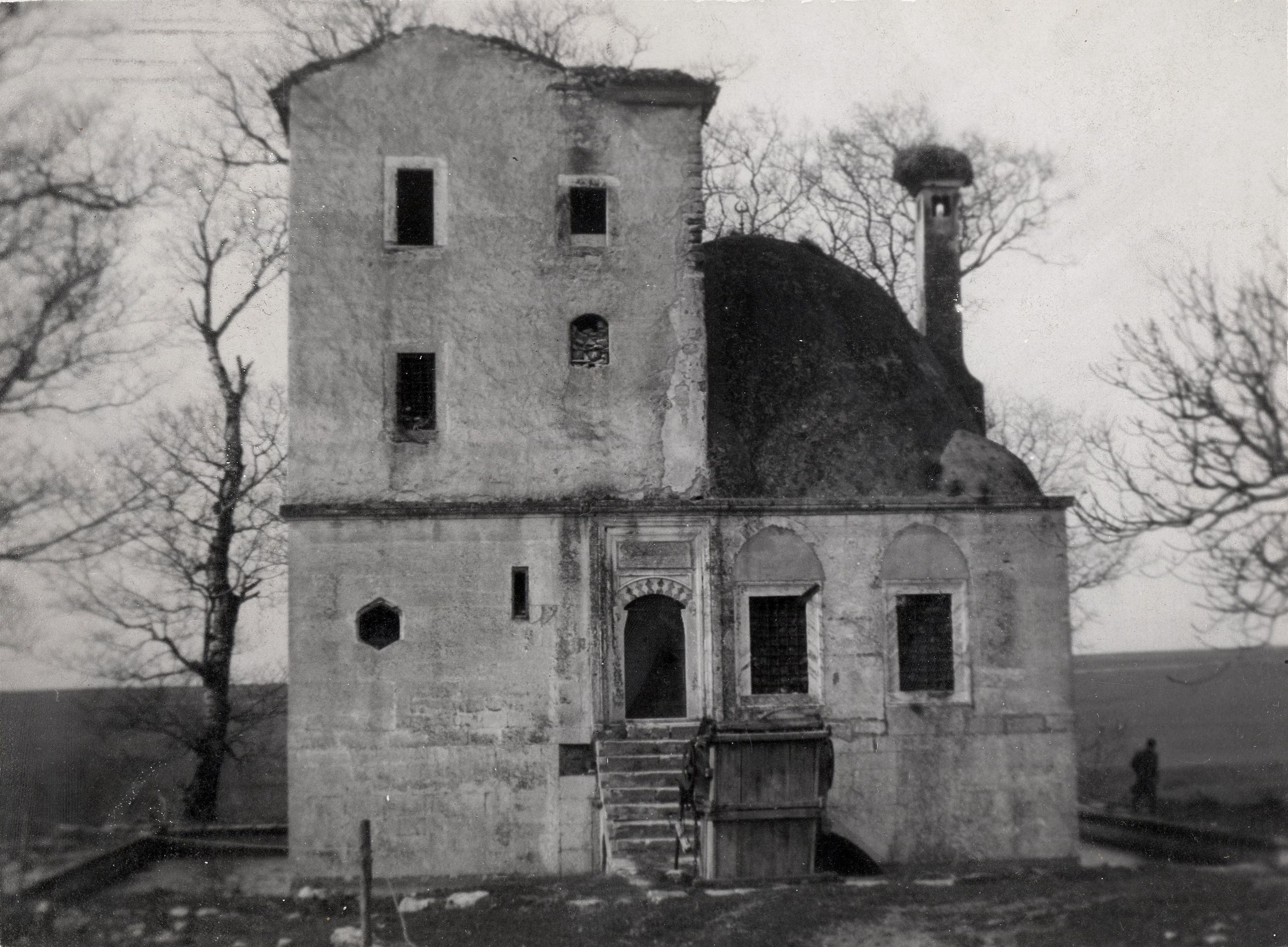
ruins of the pavilion (kasır or köşk) of Siyâvuş Paşa, namesake of the neighborhood (though the pavilion is located within the current boundaries of neighboring Şirinevler)

Siyavuşpaşa is a neighborhood in the Bahçelievler District of Istanbul, Turkey. Its population is 61,139 (2023).

== Location ==
It is bordered on the north by the Soğanlı neighborhood, on the east and southeast by the Bahçelievler neighborhood, and on the west by the Şirinevler neighborhood.

== History ==
In the Ottoman period, the vicinity of the current Bahçelievler district included several villages and farms, including the Siyavuşpaşa Farm (also called the Çavuşpaşa or Çavuşbaşı Farm), which was established on land allocated to the grand vizier Kanijeli Siyâvuş Paşa. Farms in the area were mainly vegetable gardens and vineyards.
