= İhlas News Agency =

Turkish news agency

- Native name: İhlas Haber Ajansı
- Company type: Subsidiary of İhlas Group
- Industry: News agency
- Founded: 1993; 32 years ago
- Headquarters: Istanbul, Turkey
- Number of employees: 950
- Website: iha.com.tr

İhlas News Agency (Turkish: İhlas Haber Ajansı; IHA) is a Turkish news agency which was founded in 1993, and headquartered in Istanbul, Turkey. At its founding, it was Turkey's first private news agency, as well as the first to provide news through the medium of video. IHA has a large network in Turkey with 85 regional bureaus, according to company website.

It is part of the Turkish conglomerate İhlas Holding.
