= Ahmet Mücahid Ören =

American businessman

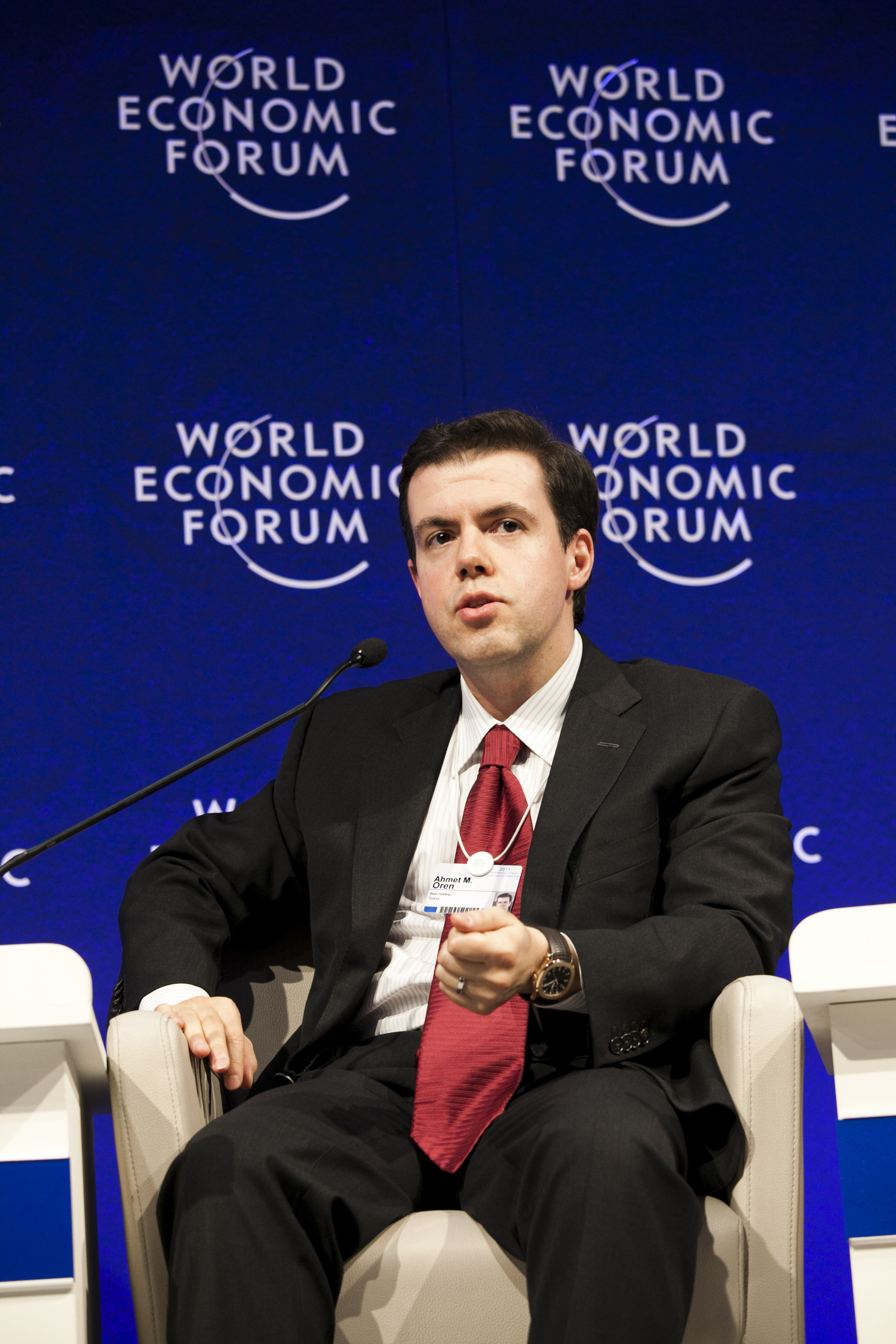
Ahmet Mücahid Ören at the World Economic Forum on Europe and Central Asia (June 2011)

Ahmet Mücahid Ören (born 1972), is the chairman and current CEO of İhlas Holding, Ören studied economics at Anadolu University and also trained as a computer systems specialist.

Ören is a naturalised citizen of the United States and had his Oath of Allegiance ceremony on 14 June 2001.

Oren is also a member of the board of directors at the Atlantic Council.

== See also ==
- Enver Ören, Ahmet Ören's father and the former chairman of the board of İhlas Holding.
