= Pelin Bilgiç =

Turkish basketball player

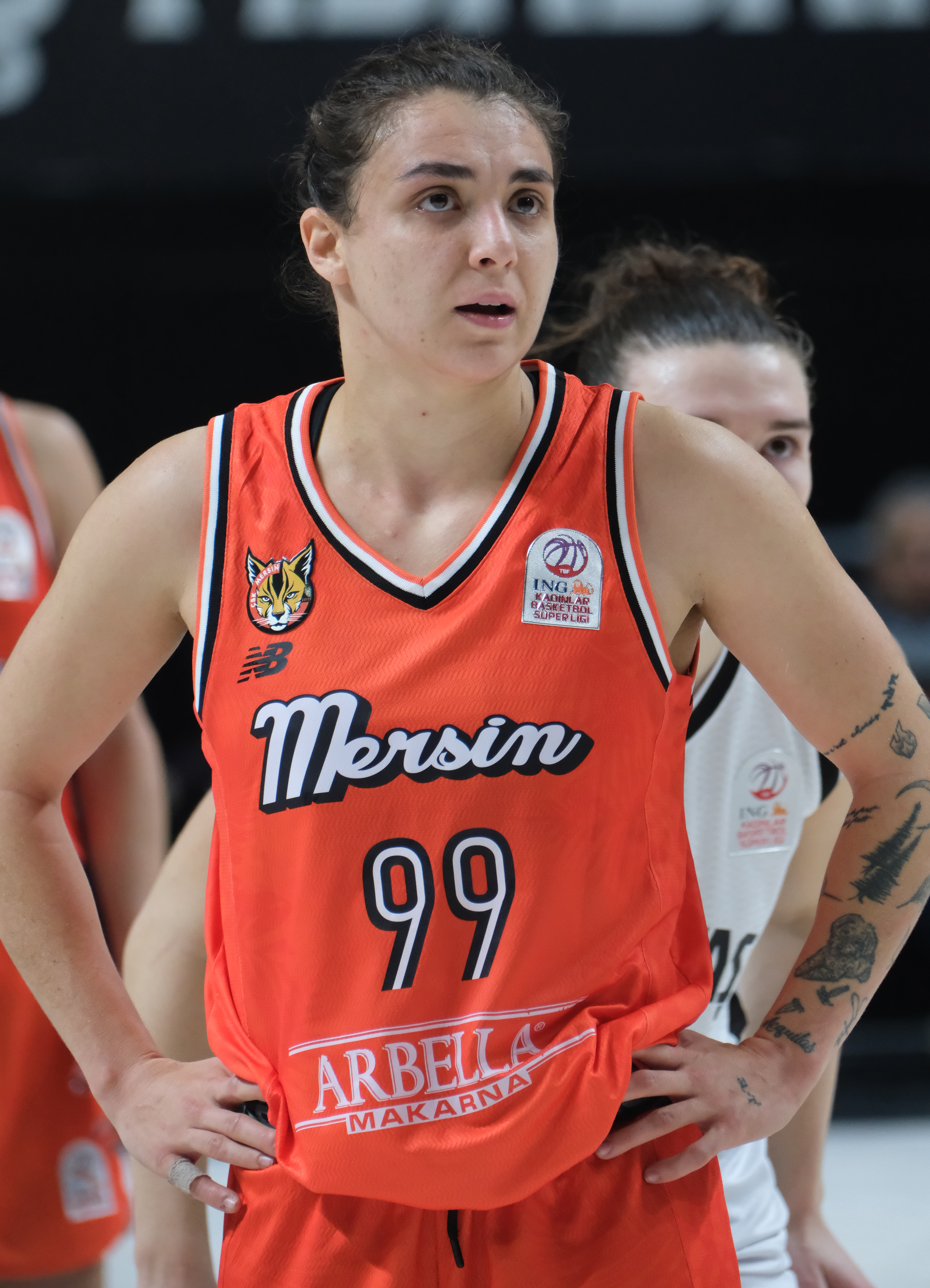

Beşiktaş JK
- Position: Shooting guard
- League: Women's Basketball Super League

Personal information
- Born: 15 July 1994 (age 32) Mersin, Turkey
- Listed height: 5 ft 8 in (1.73 m)

Career information
- Playing career: 2011–present

Career history
- 2011-2016: Botaş SK
- 2016–2018: Fenerbahçe
- 2018–2019: Çukurova Basketbol
- 2019–2020: OGM Ormanspor
- 2020–2023: Galatasaray
- 2023–2024: Nesibe Aydın GSK
- 2024: Bodrum Basketbol
- 2024–2025: Çukurova Basketbol
- 2025–: Beşiktaş JK

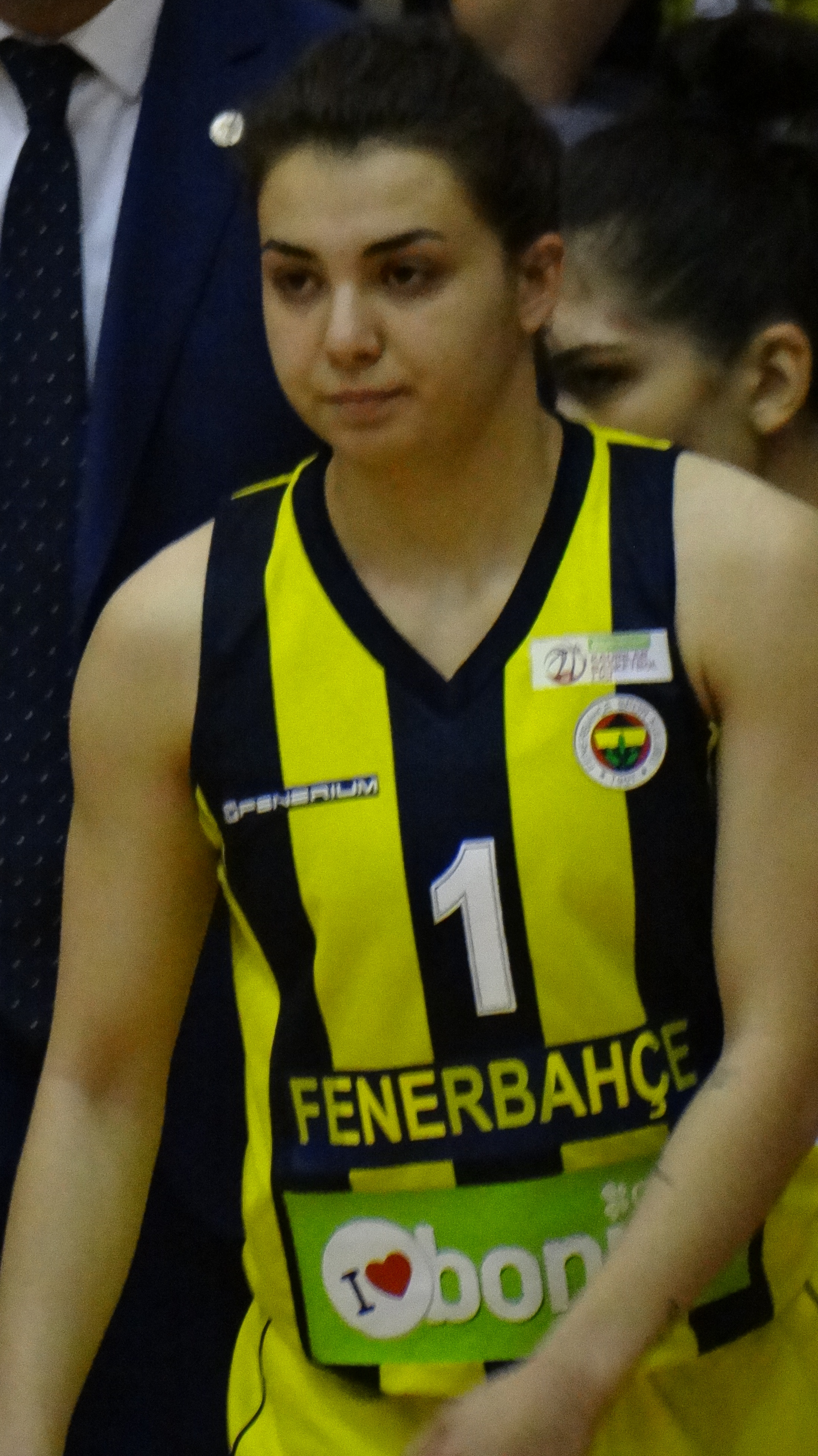

Pelin Derya Bilgiç (born 15 July 1994) is a Turkish basketball player for Beşiktaş JK and the Turkish national team.

== Club career ==
On 18 May 2021, she signed a new one-year contract with Galatasaray.

== National team career ==
She participated at the EuroBasket Women 2017.
