= Melis Gülcan =

Turkish basketball player

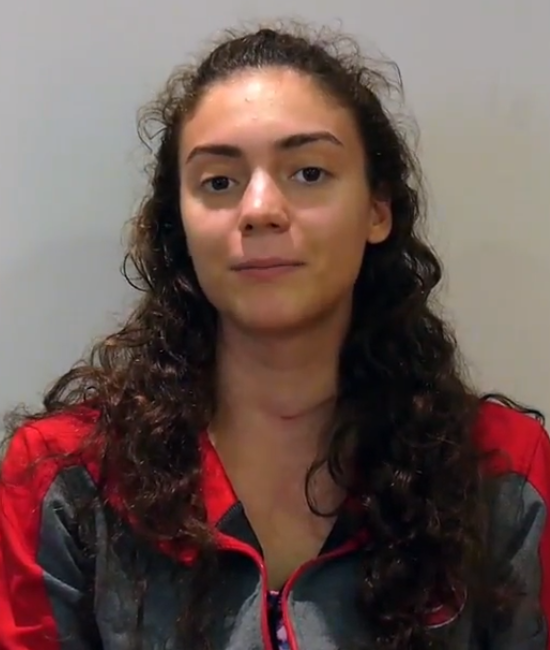
- Gülcan in 2018

Botaş SK
- Position: Small forward
- League: Turkish Super League; EuroLeague Women

Personal information
- Born: 28 May 1996 (age 30) Istanbul, Turkey
- Listed height: 6 ft 1 in (1.85 m)

Career history
- 2013–2017: Fenerbahçe
- 2017–2018: Abdullah Gül Üniversitesi
- 2018–2020: Botaş SK
- 2020–2021: Kayseri Basketbol
- 2021–2022: Galatasaray
- 2022–2023: Botaş SK
- 2023–: Çukurova Basketbol

Melis Gülcan (born 28 May 1996) is a Turkish female basketball player. The 1.85 m (6 ft 1 in) national plays Small forward.

== Career ==
On 19 May 2021, she signed a one-year contract with Galatasaray.
