= Coşkun Can Aktan =

Economist and professor (born 1963)

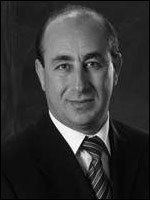
- Born: 25 January 1963 (age 62)
- Scientific career
- Fields: Public choice; Constitutional political economy; Institutional economics
- Institutions: Dokuz Eylül University; Center for Study of Public Choice, George Mason University

Coşkun Can Aktan (born 1963) is a political economist and a professor at the Faculty of Economics and Management at Dokuz Eylül University in İzmir, Turkey. He is founder and honorary chairman of the Social Sciences Research Society. Aktan is a leading expert on the privatization, analyzing and writing on the movement of Turkey from a government-owned to a market economy from its early days, making Aktan an early and internationally known source of information on Turkey's move toward a market-based economy.

He currently serves as an associate at Centre for Business and Public Sector Ethics, Cambridge, England and a research associate at the School of Public Management, Governance and Public Policy of University of Johannesburg, South Africa.

Coskun Can Aktan is the founder and editor of Journal of Law and Economics since 2009.

== Academic career ==
Aktan graduated from the Ankara School of Finance in 1979 and completed his undergraduate and graduate studies at Dokuz Eylül University. Between 1987 and 1989, he was visiting graduate student working on his dissertation under the supervision of Nobel Laureate James M. Buchanan at the Center for the Study of Public Choice at George Mason University. He returned to the same center as a visiting scholar in the 1994–1995 academic year with a research grant from the Earhart Foundation.

== Scholarships and fellowships ==
- Japan Society for the Promotion of Science Grant. (Japan Economic Policy Association, JEPA).
- Turkish Academy of Sciences (TUBA). (University of California, Los Angeles / Economics Department / visiting scholar.
- Friedrich Naumann Foundation Fellowship. (Albert Ludwigs University and Walter Eucken Institute in Freiburg / Visiting Scholar.
- DAAD (Deutscher Akademischer Austauschdienst) Fellowship. (Albert Ludwigs University and Walter Eucken Institute in Freiburg / visiting scholar.
- British Council Fellowship. (International Social Science Institute, University of Edinburgh as an honorary visiting associate.
- Earhart Foundation Grant. (the Center for Study of Public Choice, George Mason University. / visiting scholar).
- Dissertation fellowship from Higher Education Board, Turkey as well as a supplementary fund from the Center for Study of Public Choice, George Mason University, United States. The Center for Study of Public Choice as a visiting graduate student.

== Research areas ==
- Public Finance
- Public Economics
- Public Choice
- Constitutional economics
- Institutional Economics
- Political Economics

== Selected publications ==
- Ambitious, Hubris, Icarus: Political Manipulation and the Anatomy of Tyranny*, 2025, (in Turkish), ISBN 978-625-98070-1-0
- Episto-Cleros: Random Selection in Politics*, 2025, (in Turkish), ISBN 978-625-98070-4-1
- Public Choice Economics and Constitutional Political Economy*, 2024, (in Turkish), ISBN 978-975-029-160-9
- Lex Rex (From an Arbitrary State to a Constitutional State)*, with A. Ekinci, 2022, (in Turkish), ISBN 978-975-027-849-5
- The Tax State*, 2021, (in Turkish), ISBN 978-605-4239-99-3
- Nobelity: Pioneers of Law and Economics*, 2021, (in Turkish), ISBN 978-625-762-445-9
- Economics of Property Rights*, 2020, (in Turkish), ISBN 978-605-423-990-0
- Behavioral Political Economy*, 2020, (in Turkish), ISBN 978-605-337-238-7
- Fiscal Discrimination*, (2019), (in Turkish), ISBN 978-975-025-684-4
- New Schools of Economics and Economic Thought*, 2018, (in Turkish), ISBN 978-975-025-125-2
- Critique of Democracy and Demarchy*, 2017, (in Turkish), ISBN 978-605-952-423-0
- Privatization & the Turkish Experience*, 2008, (in English), ISBN 978-975-020-704-4
- Perspectives on Economics, Politics and Ethics: Selected Essays, 2008, (in English), ISBN 978-975-020-703-7
