= Enver Ören =

Turkish businessman (1939–2013)

- Born: 10 February 1939; Honaz, Denizli, Turkey
- Died: 22 February 2013 (aged 74); Şişli, Istanbul, Turkey
- Burial place: Eyüp Cemetery
- Education: Istanbul University
- Years active: 1970-2013
- Partner: Dilvin Ören (1968-2013)
- Children: 1
- Honours: State Medal of Distinguished Service

Enver Ören (10 February 1939, Honaz, Denizli – 22 February 2013, Şişli, Istanbul) was the founder of İhlas Holding. He was born in Turkey. He graduated from the Faculty of Science at Istanbul University in 1961. He was accepted to the premier military school of Turkey with a full scholarship and graduated top of his class. After graduating he went to Italy, on a NATO scholarship for one and a half years for further study and research. In the early 1970s he assumed the heavy responsibility of publishing a newspaper.

Ören was awarded the honorary degree of Doctor of Science by Selçuk University in Konya, Turkey for his contributions to the advancement of science and technology. He was also awarded the decade's most successful manager of a newspaper company (1980–1990) by the Ankara Association of Journalists. He was the Associate President of the Newspaper Owners' Association and a Board Member of the Press Advertising Authority (Basin Yayın Kurumu). He was also an honorary member of the International Islamic Science Academy. He speaks English and French and has been frequently called upon to speak and participate in numerous international seminars, meetings and symposia.

On 24 December 1999, with the signature of Prime Minister Bülent Ecevit, he was awarded the State Medal of Distinguished Service for his contributions to the glorification of the state and national interests.

Enver Ören had been married to Dilvin Ören since the 1968. The couple's only son, Ahmet Mücahid Ören, was chosen to follow his father's footsteps by assuming leadership positions within Ihlas Holding.

== Death ==
In 1990 and 2006, he underwent two kidney transplants. However, the treatment process left Ören exhausted. On 28 January 2013 he was taken to Memorial Hospital in Şişli due to a brain hemorrhage. Despite all treatments, he died on 22 February 2013 at the age of 74. His funeral was held at Eyüp Sultan Mosque with the participation of 70-80 thousand people. After the funeral prayer, he was buried in Eyüp Cemetery.
