= Efe Güven =

Turkish basketball coach

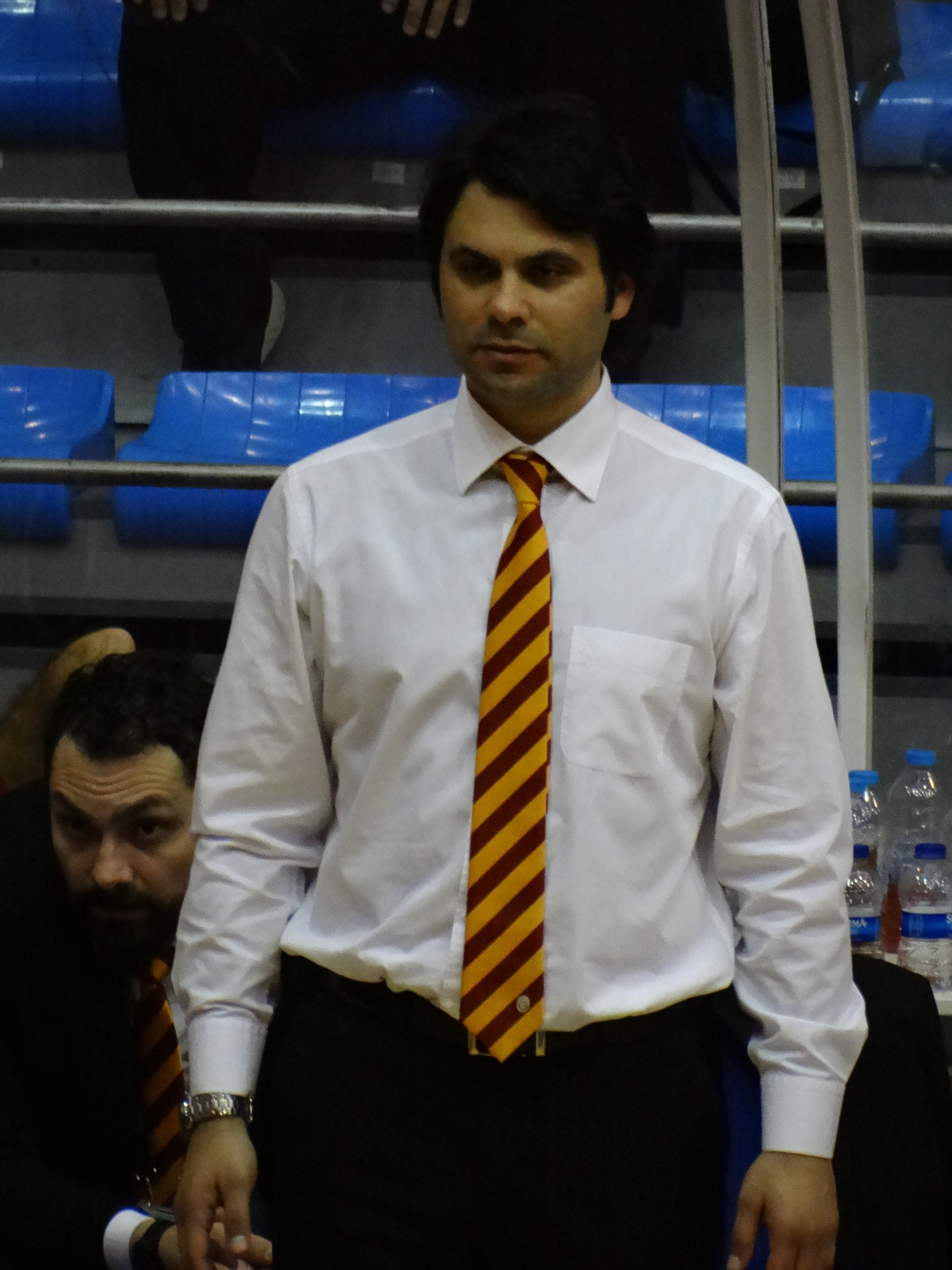

Free agent
- Position: Head coach

Personal information
- Born: January 31, 1985 (age 41) Istanbul, Turkey
- Coaching career: 2011–present

Career history

Coaching
- 2015–2016: Turkey U-20 (assistant)
- 2017–2018: Galatasaray (assistant)
- 2018–2022: Galatasaray
- 2024–2025: Nesibe Aydın GSK
- 2025: Kocaeli Kadın Basketbol SK

Efe Güven (born January 31, 1985) is a Turkish professional basketball coach.

== Career ==
In the statement made on 27 April 2022, it was announced that Güven, who has been the Head Coach of Galatasaray since 2018, parted ways.
