= Hamza Aktan =

Turkish journalist

Hamza Aktan (born 10 December 1983 in Derecik, Turkey) is a Kurdish journalist and writer.

He studied journalism and law. He is the author of a book titled Kürt Vatandaş (Turkish: The Kurdish Citizen). He has worked for several Turkish publications including Bianet, BirGün, Post Express, Nokta, Yeni Şafak, Toplumsal Tarih and IMC TV as correspondent, editor, and news director. He also has contributed to some other Turkish publications including Birikim, haysiyet.com, and Radikal.
