= A. Emin Aktan =

American engineer

- Born: Ahmet Emin Aktan
- Education: University of California, Berkeley; University of Illinois at Urbana–Champaign
- Engineering career
- Institutions: Drexel University

Ahmet Emin Aktan is an American engineer, focusing in health monitoring, currently the John Roebling Professor of Infrastructure Studies at Drexel University. He is an Honorary Professor at Muğla University.

== Education ==
- Post-Doctoral Research in Earthquake-Structural Engineering at University of California, Berkeley (1979–1984)
- Ph.D. in Earthquake Structural Engineering from the University of Illinois at Urbana-Champaign (1970–1973)
- B.S. (1967) and M.Sc. (1968) in Civil/Structural Engineering, Middle East Technical University (METU), Ankara
