= İzmit Belediyespor =

Turkish women's basketball team

- Leagues: Super League
- Founded: 1995; 31 years ago
- Arena: Şehit Polis Recep Topaloğlu (capacity: 5,000)
- Location: İzmit, Kocaeli
- Team colors: Blue, green
- President: Uğur Koştur
- Head coach: Fırat Okul

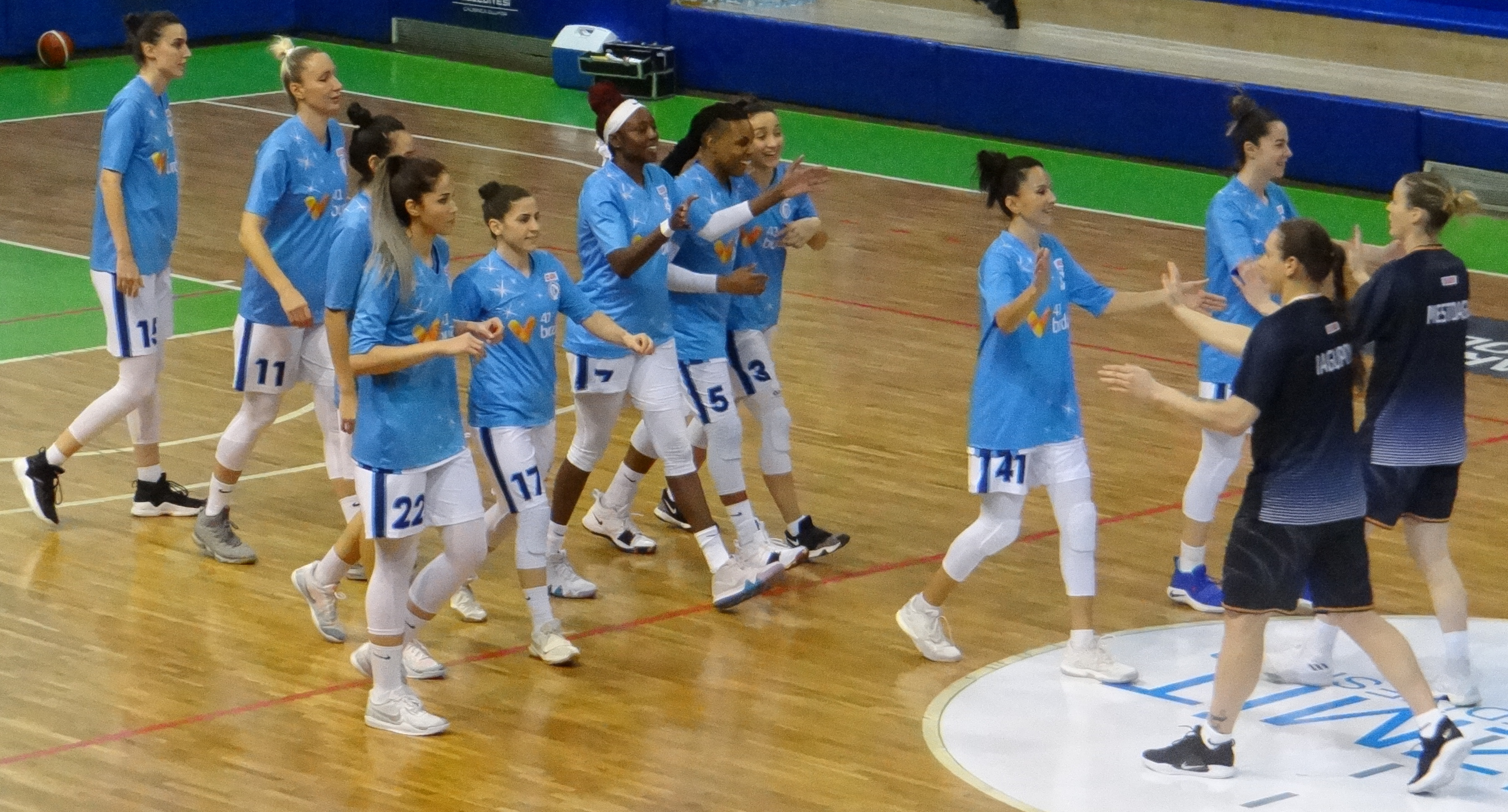
İzmit Belediyespor before the Turkish Super League game. (December 2018)

İzmit Belediyespor is a Turkish women's basketball club based in İzmit, Turkey. The club was founded in 1995 and currently competing in the Women's Basketball Super League.

== History ==
The club was invited to the Super League in 2018 after the Yakın Doğu Üniversitesi withdrew from the league. After playing in the 2020 Turkish Cup final, the club competed in the Euroleague in the 2020–21 season.

== Current roster ==
İzmit Belediyespor 2021–22 roster
Players
Coaches

Pos.	No.	Nat.	Name	Ht.	Wt.	Age
C	3	(Turkey)	Garip, İpek	1.88 m (6 ft 2 in)		24 – 3 June 2002
G	4	(Turkey)	Türk, İdil	1.75 m (5 ft 9 in)		30 – 19 April 1996
G	5	(Turkey)	Uğur, Gülse	1.70 m (5 ft 7 in)		26 – 29 November 1999
G	8	(Turkey)	Korkmaz, Melisa	1.74 m (5 ft 9 in)		29 – 28 March 1997
G	10	(Turkey)	Dikmenoğulları, Sıla	1.78 m (5 ft 10 in)		23 – 7 July 2003
F/C	15	(Turkey)	Sığırcı, Emel (C)	1.94 m (6 ft 4 in)		34 – 24 October 1992
G	21	(Canada)	Fields, Nirra	1.76 m (5 ft 9 in)		32 – 3 December 1993
F	34	(Bulgaria)	Mircheva, Viktoria	1.90 m (6 ft 3 in)		39 – 17 January 1987
G/F	41	(Turkey)	Paylar, Defne	1.77 m (5 ft 10 in)		25 – 6 June 2001
C	42	(United States)	Higgins, Kristina	1.96 m (6 ft 5 in)		32 – 4 February 1994
F	44	(Romania)	Mărginean, Gabriela	1.83 m (6 ft 0 in)		39 – 12 February 1987

Head coach

- (Turkey) Fırat Okul

Assistant coach(es)

- (Turkey) Enes Akdilek

Legend

- (C) Team captain
- Injured

== Honours ==
=== Domestic competitions ===
- Federation Cup
  - Champion: 2017–2018
