= Gizem Yavuz =

Turkish basketball player

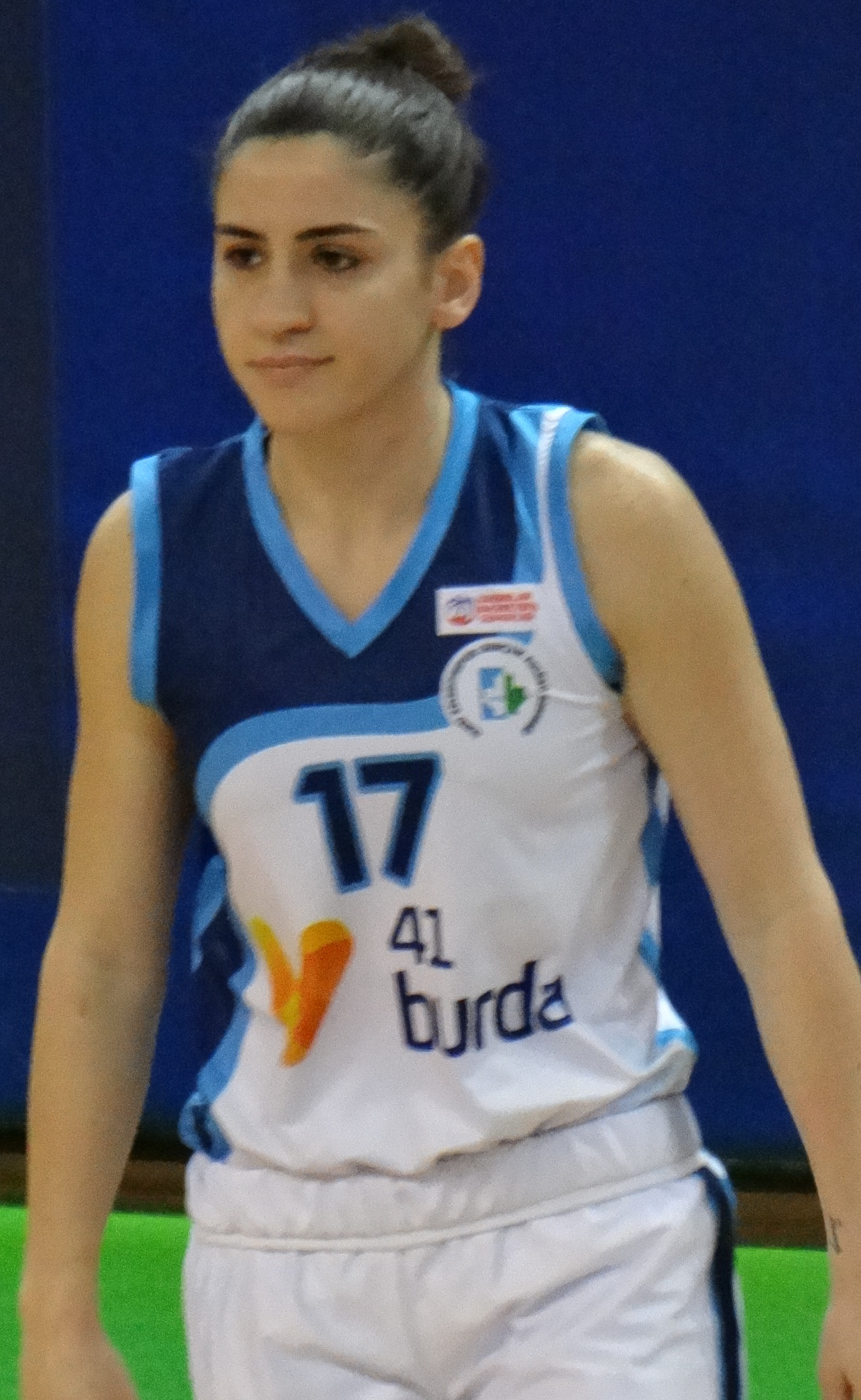
- Yavuz in 2018

Personal information
- Born: 10 March 1988 (age 38) Yalova, Turkey
- Listed height: 5 ft 7 in (1.70 m)
- Position: Point guard

Career history
- 2004–2010: İstanbul Üniversitesi
- 2010–2011: Kayseri Şekerspor
- 2011–2012: TED Ankara Kolejliler
- 2012–2013: Antakya Belediyespor
- 2013–2014: Orduspor
- 2014–2015: Basketbolu Geliştirenler Derneği
- 2015–2016: İstanbul Üniversitesi
- 2016: Bornova Beckerspor
- 2016–2017: İstanbul Üniversitesi
- 2017–2018: Canik Belediyespor
- 2018–2020: İzmit Belediyespor
- 2020–2021: Çankaya Üniversitesi
- 2021–2022: Galatasaray
- 2022–2023: Emlak Konut SK
- 2023–2024: Galatasaray

Gizem Yavuz (born 10 March 1988) is a Turkish former female basketball player. The 1.70 m (5 ft 7 in) national plays Point guard.

== Career ==
On 20 May 2021, she signed a one-year contract with Galatasaray.

On 29 July 2023, she signed a contract with her former team Galatasaray.

Gizem left the club at the conclusion of the 2024 season, with Galatasaray releasing a farewell message on May 15, 2024, thanking her for her "efforts and dedication" in the yellow and red jersey.
