= Emel Türkyılmaz =

Turkish basketball player

Emel Sığırcı
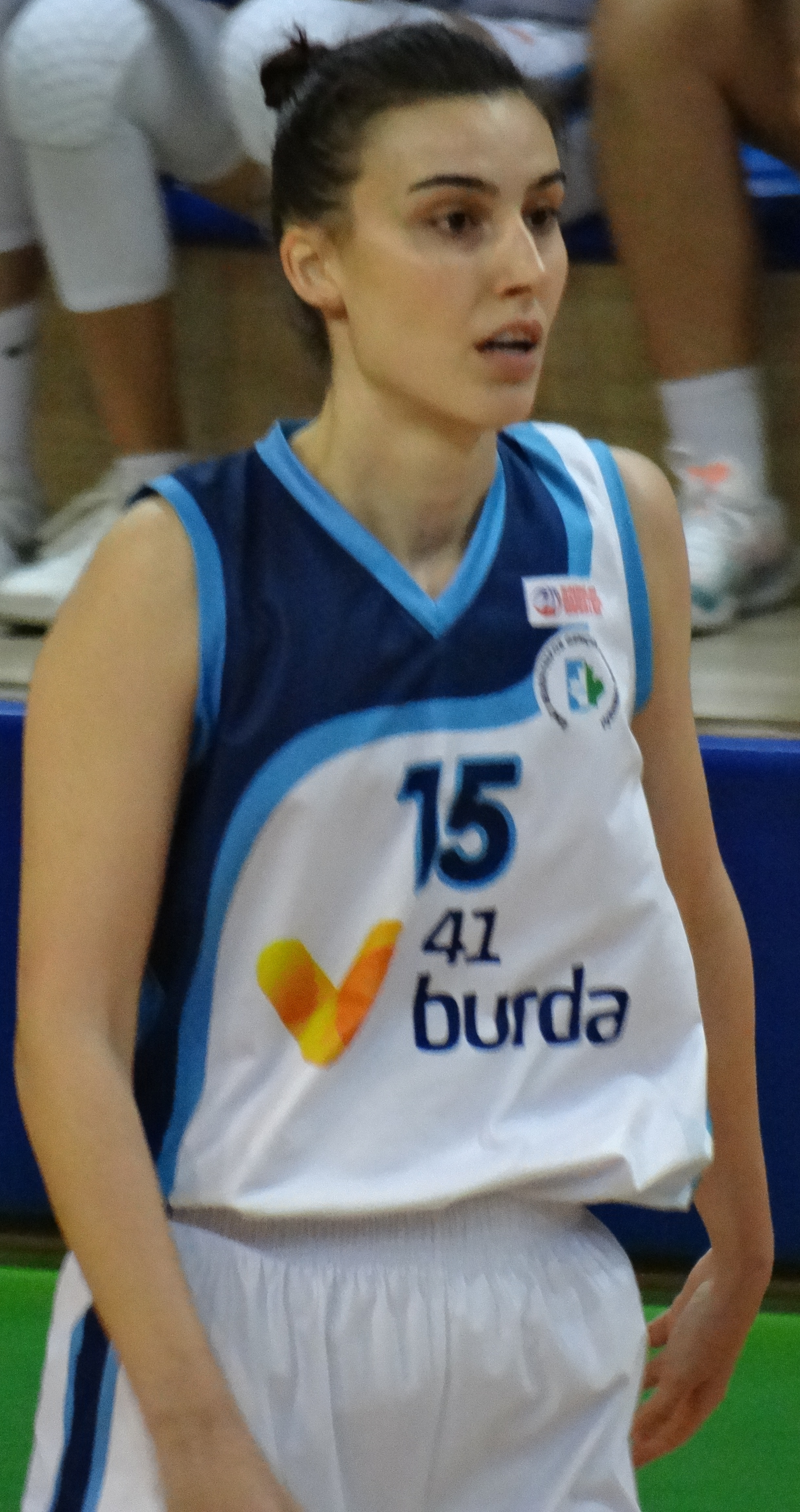

No. 15 – İzmit Belediyespor
- Positions: Power Forward, Center
- League: Turkish Super League

Personal information
- Born: October 24, 1992 (age 34) Ayvalık, Turkey
- Listed height: 6 ft 4 in (1.93 m)

Career information
- Playing career: 2006–present

Career history
- 2006–2011: Antalya Buyuksehir Belediyespor
- 2011–2013: Fenerbahçe
- 2013–2014: Ceyhan Belediyespor
- 2014–2016: Mersin Büyükşehir Belediyespor
- 2016–2017: Mersin Basketbol
- 2017–2018: Urla Belediyespor
- 2018–present: İzmit Belediyespor

Emel Sığırcı (born 24 October 1992 in Ayvalık, Turkey) is a Turkish basketball player. She currently plays for the Turkish professional basketball club İzmit Belediyespor.

== See also ==
- Turkish women in sports
