= Gizem Başaran =

Turkish basketball player

Gizem Başaran Turan
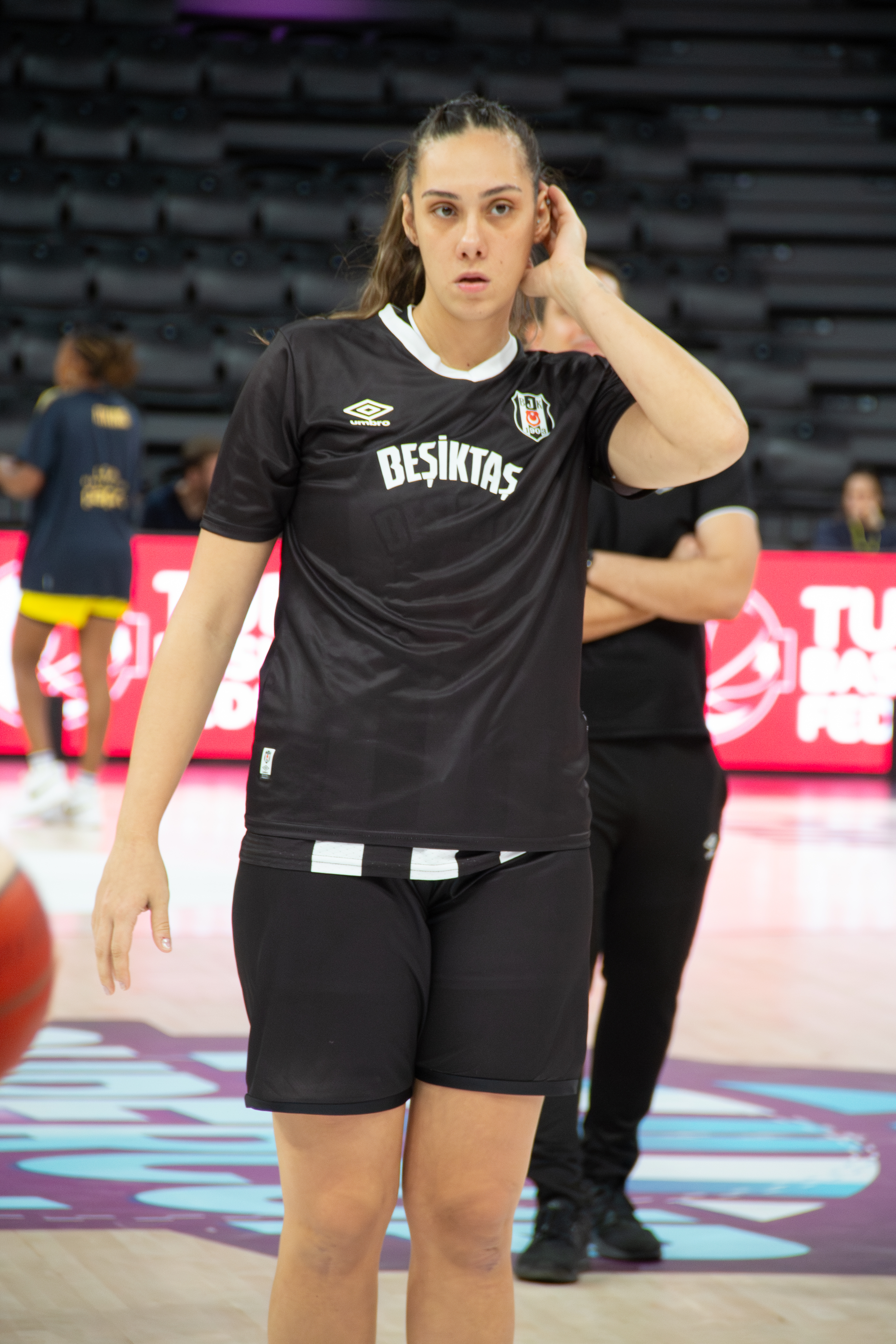

No. 15 – Emlak Konut
- Position: Center
- League: Turkish Super League

Personal information
- Born: 28 September 1992 (age 34) Istanbul, Turkey
- Listed height: 6 ft 4 in (1.93 m)

Career information
- Playing career: 2009–present

Career history
- 2009–2012: Galatasaray
- 2010–2011: → Edremit Belediyespor
- 2011–2012: → Burhaniye Belediyespor
- 2012–2013: Orduspor
- 2013–2014: Antakya Belediyespor
- 2014: Mersin Basketbol
- 2015: Mersin Kurtuluşspor
- 2015–2016: Beşiktaş
- 2016–2017: Yakın Doğu Üniversitesi
- 2017–2018: Galatasaray
- 2018–2021: Hatay Büyükşehir Belediyespor
- 2021–2022: Galatasaray
- 2022–2023: Hatayspor
- 2023: Fenerbahçe
- 2023–2024: Emlak Konut
- 2024–2025: Beşiktaş
- 2025–present: Emlak Konut

Gizem Başaran (born 28 September 1992) is a Turkish basketball player. The 1.93 m (6 ft 4 in) national plays Center.

== Career ==
On 20 May 2021, she signed a one-year contract with Galatasaray.
