= Yenibosna =

Quarter of Istanbul, Turkey

Yenibosna Yenibosna Semti
- Quarter
- Interactive map of Yenibosna
- Coordinates: 40°59′51″N 28°49′02″E
- Country: Turkey
- Region: Marmara
- Province: Istanbul
- District: Bahçelievler
- Time zone: UTC+3 (TRT)
- Postal code: 34197
- Area code: 0212

Yenibosna is a quarter located in the Bahçelievler district of Istanbul, Turkey.

== History ==
The earliest population record was 350 people. The original settlement was initially named Saraybosna, the Turkish name for the city Sarajevo, which had previously been under Turkish rule during the Ottoman Empire period. Saraybosna remained a small settlement despite being a short distance from Istanbul, the capital of the Ottoman Empire.

The founding of the Republic of Turkey saw a rapid development of the area, which was absorbed into Istanbul and the current name of Yenibosna ("New Bosnia") was adopted. The remains of the old settlement can be seen in the courtyard behind Yenibosna Primary School.

== Neighbourhoods ==
- Yenibosna Merkez
- Çobançeşme
- Fevzi Çakmak
- Zafer
