= Bahçelievler =

- District and municipality
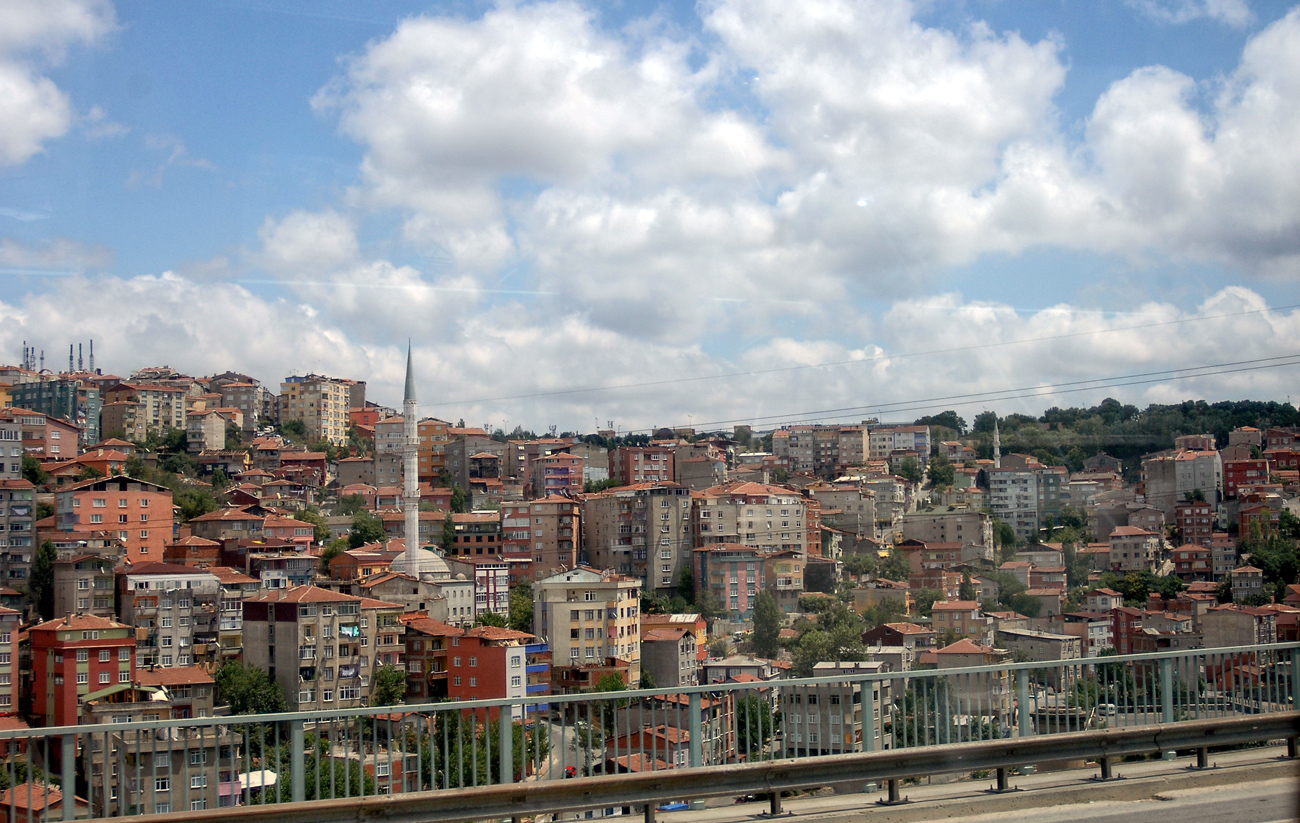

- Logo

- Map showing Bahçelievler District in Istanbul Province

- Location within Turkey Location within Istanbul
- Coordinates: 40°59′51″N 28°51′02″E
- Country: Turkey
- Province: Istanbul

Government
  - Mayor: Hakan Bahadır (AKP)
- Area: 17 km^{2} (6.6 sq mi)
- Population (2022): 594,350
  - Density: 35,000/km^{2} (91,000/sq mi)
- Time zone: UTC+3 (TRT)
- Area code: 0212
- Website: www.bahcelievler.istanbul

Bahçelievler (meaning "houses with gardens" in Turkish) is a municipality and district of Istanbul Province, Turkey. Its area is 17 km^{2} (0.3% of Istanbul Province), and its population is 594,350 (2022). It is a large middle class residential suburb of Istanbul, on the European side of the city. It is accessible from the D.100 that runs from the Istanbul airport to the Asian side of the city. Bahçelievler is the northern neighbour of Bakırköy.

== History ==
Stone quarried in Bahçelievler was employed to build the old city of Constantinople. Prior to the Ottoman conquest of Constantinople, the area was largely farmland occupied predominantly by ethnic Greeks. After the foundation of the Turkish Republic in the 1920s, Bahçelievler emerged from settlements built alongside roads stretching out from the center of the province towards Europe -first the Londra Asfalt, and the later E5, built in the 1960s. Factories were built alongside the roads, followed by dense housing and apartment buildings. The population of Bahçelievler grew from 8,500 in 1960 to 100,000 in 1975 and today nearly half a million people are packed into 16.7 km^{2}. In the 1970s part of the area was built to plan, and -until the 1980s- Bahçelievler was indeed full of houses with gardens, as its name suggests. During the rapid economic growth of Turkey in the 1980s and 1990s most of these houses were pulled down, sold to developers, and replaced with apartment blocks- with far less green space between them; today the name Bahçelievler only accurately describes the central Bahçelievler District.

== Today ==
Some districts of Bahçelievler – such as Bahçelievler, Basın Sitesi and Yayla – are well lit, with tree-lined avenues of attractive buildings and small parks, big shopping centres, cinemas and many small cafés. Traffic in these districts is congested, despite efforts undertaken in 2006 to relieve the pressure with new roads, bridges and underpasses. Outlying districts such as Yenibosna or Soğanlı consist largely of factories, retail and small businesses (including many textile wholesalers), intermixed with extremely dense housing (typically, 6–8-story apartment buildings packed together in long rows) and run through with arterial roads. The infrastructure is poor, and the narrow streets are often choked with traffic. There are branches of four universities, many public and private schools and hospitals. Prominent landmarks include the Unverdi shopping centre (on the site of the old Unverdi cinema, in the centre of the district) and the Omur Plaza on the E5, by the Incirli Metrobus station.

== Composition ==
There are 11 neighbourhoods in Bahçelievler District:

- Bahçelievler
- Çobançeşme
- Cumhuriyet
- Fevzi Çakmak
- Hürriyet
- Kocasinan Merkez
- Şirinevler
- Siyavuşpaşa
- Soğanlı
- Yenibosna Merkez
- Zafer

== Transportation ==
Bahçelievler is accessible via bus, minibus, dolmuş (share taxi), or car, primarily from the E5 highway, and municipal train. Transit duration depends on the hour, but has been greatly reduced with the introduction of dedicated Metrobus lanes; typical times from the major hubs in Eminönü and Mecidiyeköy run from 35–15 minutes, respectively, and under an hour to the Söğütlüçeşme Metrobus hub in Kadıköy. Atatürk International Airport is 10 minutes away by municipal train. Expedient crossing to Asia is available by sea-bus from the adjacent municipality of Bakırköy, with connections to Kadıköy and Bostancı.

== Population ==
Historical population

Year	Pop.	±% p.a.
1935	523	—
1940	542	+0.72%
1945	601	+2.09%
1950	812	+6.20%
1955	1,322	+10.24%
1960	8,509	+45.12%
1965	20,881	+19.67%
1970	49,320	+18.76%
1975	102,533	+15.76%

Year	Pop.	±% p.a.
1980	160,733	+9.41%
1985	237,691	+8.14%
1990	322,234	+6.28%
1997	442,877	+4.65%
2007	571,711	+2.59%
2012	600,162	+0.98%
2017	598,454	−0.06%
2022	594,350	−0.14%

Source: Governor's office (1935-1990) Population census (1997) and TÜIK (2007-2022)
